= 200s BC (decade) =

Decade

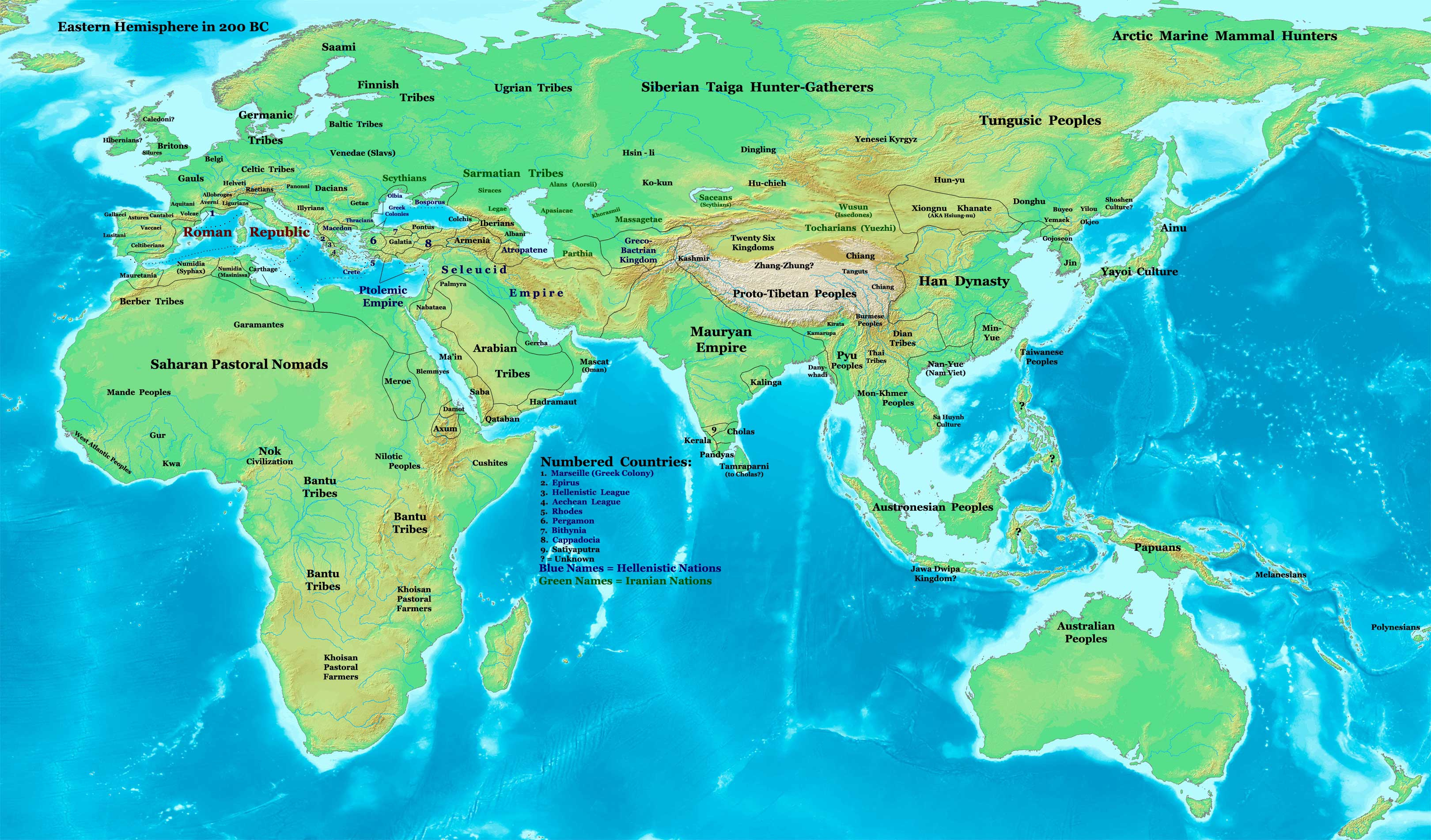
Map of the Eastern Hemisphere in 200 BC.

This article concerns the 200 BC decade, that lasted from 209 BC to 200 BC.

== Events ==
=== 209 BC ===
==== By place ====
====== Roman Republic ======
- The Romans under Quintus Fabius Maximus Verrucosus capture Tarentum (modern Taranto), which the Carthaginian general Hannibal has held for three years.
- The Battle of Canusium is fought between Hannibal's Carthaginian army and a Roman force led by Marcus Claudius Marcellus. The battle is indecisive.
- From his headquarters at Tarraco (Tarragona), Publius Cornelius Scipio, the Roman commander in Spain, launches a combined military and naval assault on the Carthaginian headquarters at Carthago Nova (modern-day Cartagena). He successfully besieges and captures the city. In capturing this city, Scipio gains access to copious stores and supplies, Spanish hostages, the local silver mines, a splendid harbour and a base for an advance further south.

====== Seleucid Empire ======
- The King of the Parthians, Arsaces II, is attacked by the Seleucid king Antiochus III, who takes Hecatompylos (southeast of the Caspian Sea), the Arsacid capital and Syrinx in Hyrcania. Antiochus III defeats Arsaces II at the Battle of Mount Labus and then forces Arsaces II to enter into an alliance with the Seleucids.

====== Greece ======
- As strategos of the Achaeans, the Greek general Philopoemen is responsible for turning the Achaean League into an aggressive military power. He builds up the League's military capability. The Achaean League's army and cavalry under Philopoemen then defeat the Aetolians on the Elean frontier.

====== China ======
- Jiao, Lord of Wey is deposed by Emperor Qin Er Shi, marking the end of the state of Wei
- In August, Chen Sheng and Wu Guang begin an uprising to oppose Qin
- The rebels restore the monarchies of Chu, Qi, Yan, Zhao, Wei and (in 208) Han.
- The Qin general Zhang Han defeats an invasion of Guanzhong by the rebel general Zhou Wen.
- Wu Guang is killed by his own officers, and Zhang Han defeats Chen Sheng, who is killed by an attendant while in flight.
- Having helped to conquer Baiyue in northern Vietnam and southern China for the Qin dynasty, the general Zhao Tuo uses the rebellions against the Qin to establish his own independent kingdom in Nanyue, and conquers the neighboring provinces of Guilin and Xiang. He declares himself King Wu of Nanyue.

====== Central Asia ======
- Modun khaan inherits Teoman's Hunnu confederations and founds the Xiongnu Empire in Mongolia proper. Modu's forces push into Northern China, threatening the Qin Empire and forcing them to further fortify the Great Wall.

=== 208 BC ===
==== By place ====
====== Roman Republic ======
- The Romans under Publius Cornelius Scipio defeat the Carthaginians under their commander Hasdrubal Barca at Baecula (Bailen) in Baetica. As a result, Hasdrubal Barca decides to cross the Pyrenees with his remaining troops into Transalpine Gaul, with the intention of joining his brother Hannibal in Italy.
- The Roman general Marcus Claudius Marcellus is killed in battle while fighting Hannibal near Venusia, Apulia.
- Hannibal destroys a Roman force at the Battle of Petelia.

====== Seleucid Empire ======
- Antiochus III advances into Bactria, which is ruled by the Greco-Bactrian king Euthydemus I, and defeats Euthydemus at the Battle of the Arius. After resisting a siege of his capital Bactra (Balkh) by the Seleucids, Euthydemus obtains an honourable peace by which Antiochus promises Euthydemus' son Demetrius the hand of one of his daughters.

====== China ======
- Zhang Han defeats and kills the rebel leader Xiang Liang in the Battle of Dingtao.
- Qin Prime Minister Li Si is executed by Qin Er Shi, having been conspired against by the eunuch Zhao Gao, who replaces him as Prime Minister.
- Zhang Han seizes the Zhao capital Handan and besieges its king Zhao Xie in Julu.
- Xiang Liang's nephew Xiang Yu seizes control of Liang's army.

=== 207 BC ===
==== By place ====
====== Roman Republic ======
- The Roman consul Gaius Claudius Nero fights an indecisive battle with the Carthaginian general Hannibal at Grumentum. Nero is unable to stop Hannibal's advance into Canusium. Nevertheless, he rapidly marches the elite parts of his army some one hundred kilometres north to reinforce the army of Marcus Livius Salinator.
- The Battle of the Metaurus, fought near the Metaurus River in Umbria, is a pivotal battle during the Second Punic War between Rome and Carthage. The Carthaginians are led by Hannibal's brother Hasdrubal Barca, and the Roman armies are led by the consuls Marcus Livius Salinator and Gaius Claudius Nero. The Carthaginian army is defeated by the Romans and Hasdrubal is killed in the battle. This major loss by the Carthaginians ends Hannibal's hopes of success in Italy.

====== Greece ======
- The general leading the Achaean League, Philopoemen, introduces heavier Macedonian armour and phalanx tactics. His army then crushes the Spartans under the Spartan regent and general, Machanidas, in the battle of Mantinea. Machanidas is killed by Philopoemen during the battle.
- Nabis, a Syrian sold into slavery, rises to power in Sparta and becomes regent of the young Spartan king, Pelops, following the death of Machanidas. Nabis soon overthrows Pelops, claiming to be a descendant of the Eurypontid Spartan king Demaratus. Nabis then starts a social revolution which will lead to the freeing of all the helots, the destruction of the ruling oligarchy, the redistribution of land and the cancelling of debts.

====== Vietnam ======
- When king An Dương Vương dies, so does his dynasty and the Triệu dynasty and the kingdom of Nam Việt are established.

====== China ======
- The Chu rebel Xiang Yu defeats the Qin general Zhang Han in the Battle of Julu and becomes the leader of the rebellion against the Qin dynasty.
- Xiang Yu defeats Zhang Han in the Battle of the Yushui River. Zhang Han then surrenders to Xiang Yu.
- Emperor Qin Er Shi of the Qin dynasty is assassinated by Prime Minister Zhao Gao. He is replaced by his nephew Ziying, who in turn assassinates Zhao Gao. Ziying takes power as the king of Qin rather than as emperor.
- The Chu rebel Liu Bang invades Guanzhong. After another military defeat, Ziying surrenders to Liu, who then occupies the Qin capital Xianyang. This marks the end of the Qin dynasty.

=== 206 BC ===
==== By place ====
====== Roman Republic ======
- In the Battle of Ilipa (Alcalá del Río, near Seville) in Spain, the Carthaginian generals, Mago Barca and Hasdrubal Gisco, are defeated by the Roman general Publius Cornelius Scipio. Mago retreats to Gades (modern Cádiz) and then sails for the Balearic Islands.
- The Roman general Publius Cornelius Scipio secures Gades, thus making Roman control of Spain complete. With the effective withdrawal of the Carthaginians from Spain, Hispania becomes a Roman province.
- The city of Italica (northwest of modern Seville, Spain) is founded by Scipio as a place to settle for the Roman soldiers wounded in the Battle of Ilipa.
- After having successfully driven the Carthaginians out of Spain, Scipio returns in triumph to Rome and is elected consul. He then prepares to carry the war into Carthage's territory in North Africa.

====== Carthage ======
- Hasdrubal Gisco retreats to the coast and then crosses to North Africa, where he gives his daughter in marriage to Syphax, king of the Numidian Masaesyli tribe, to formalize their military alliance.
- After being an ally of Carthage and fighting with them, Numidian chieftain, Masinissa switches sides when the Carthaginians are driven from Spain and offers to assist Rome. Syphax expels his rival Masinissa and claims himself to be King of Numidia. The Romans support Masinissa's claim to the Numidian throne against Syphax, the pro-Carthaginian ruler of the Masaesyli tribe.

====== Persia ======
- Arsaces II, king of the Parthians, loses territory in battles with Euthydemus I, ruler of Bactria.
- Antiochus III marches across the Hindu Kush into the Kabul valley and renews his friendship with the Indian king Sophagasenus.

====== Greece ======
- The war between Macedonia and Rome drags on with no decisive advantage on either side. Rome's interest lies not in conquest, but in keeping Macedon, the Greek city-states and Greek political leagues continually divided and non-threatening.
- Philip V of Macedon is able to take advantage of Roman inactivity. After sacking Thermum, the religious and political centre of Aetolia, Philip is able to force the Aetolians to accept a peace treaty based on his terms.

====== China ======
- A period of civil war known as the Chu-Han contention begins.
- Xiang Yu divides China in a power-sharing arrangement known as the Eighteen Kingdoms, with himself the de facto supreme ruler as Hegemon-King of Western Chu.
- Xiang Yu appoints Huai II of Chu as Emperor Yi of China, but he has him assassinated later in the year.
- Liu Bang, as the newly appointed king of Hanzhong, and his new General-in-Chief Han Xin, invade Guanzhong, defeat the king of Yong, Zhang Han, and conquer the lands of the Three Qins, thus beginning hostilities with Xiang Yu.
- Liu Bang makes Yueyang his capital and begins to expand his realm into the Central Plain.
- Xiang Yu campaigns against a rebellion in Qi.
- The Jian and Dao swords are created during this time (approximate date).

=== 205 BC ===
==== By place ====
====== Seleucid Empire ======
- Returning via the Persian provinces of Arachosia, Drangiana, and Carmania, Antiochus III arrives in Persis. He then leads a short expedition down the Persian Gulf and receives tribute of 500 talents of silver from the citizens of Gerrha, a mercantile state on the west coast of the Persian Gulf.
- Antiochus III returns from his eastern campaigns, after having defeated the Bactrians and subjugated the Parthians and thus being able to partly restore Seleucid power in these provinces by crushing the revolting governors of Media, Persia and Anatolia. Having established a system of vassal states in the East, Antiochus now adopts the ancient Achaemenid title of "great king", and the Greeks, comparing him to Alexander the Great, surname him "the Great", that is to say Antiochus III Megas.

====== Greece ======
- Philip V of Macedon makes a temporary peace (the Peace of Phoenice) with Rome on favourable terms for Macedonia ending the First Macedonian War. The treaty formally acknowledges the favourable position of Macedonia, including their capture of Illyria, but in return Philip effectively repudiates his alliance with Hannibal.
- After the peace, the Spartan king, Nabis, goes to war with the Achaean League. The Achaean general Philopoemen expels Nabis of Sparta from Messene.
- The Peace of Phoenice prohibits Philip from expanding westward into Illyria or the Adriatic Sea, so the king turns his attentions eastwards to the Aegean Sea, where he starts to build a large fleet. After concluding the First Macedonian War, Philip of Macedon, seeing his chance to defeat Rhodes, forms an alliance with Aetolian and Spartan pirates who begin raiding Rhodian ships. The Cretan War begins between Philips' Macedonians, the Aetolian League, several Cretan cities (of which Olous and Hierapytna are the most important) and Spartan pirates against the forces of Rhodes and later Attalus I of Pergamum, Byzantium, Cyzicus, Athens and Knossos.
- With the Rhodian fleet and economy suffering from the depredations of the pirates, Philip begins attacking the lands of Rhodes' allies in Thrace and around the Sea of Marmara.

====== Roman Republic ======
- Publius Cornelius Scipio boldly determines to disregard Hannibal in Italy and political opposition in the Roman Senate and rather decides to strike at the Carthaginian holdings in North Africa. Scipio crosses to Sicily with an army consisting partly of volunteers as the Roman Senate would not provide him with an army.
- The Roman propraetor Quintus Pleminius captures the town of Locri Epizephyrii from the Carthaginians. Hannibal's attempt to recapture the town is foiled by the appearance of Scipio's army.
- Scipio sends the Roman general Gaius Laelius to North Africa to prepare the way for his later invasion.
- A Carthaginian army under Mago Barca lands in Liguria, capturing Genoa and Savona.
- Hannibal erects a bilingual Punic/Greek inscription describing his accomplishments in the temple of Juno Lacinia near Crotone.

====== Egypt ======
- The native Egyptian population rises in rebellion against their Greek rulers. The revolt spreads to Upper Egypt.
- Ptolemy IV dies and is succeeded by his five-year-old son Ptolemy V. However, no public announcement is made about the king's death.

====== China ======
- Xiang Yu defeats Liu Bang in the Battle of Pengcheng.
- Han Xin captures Feiqiu, the last holdout of Zhang Han, thus completing the Han conquest of the Three Qins. Zhang Han commits suicide.
- Han Xin defeats Wei Bao and conquers the kingdom of Wei.
- Xiang Yu besieges Liu Bang's forces in Xingyang and Chenggao.
- Han Xin begins the conquest of Dai and Zhao, and he defeats Chen Yu in the Battle of Jingxing.
- Ying Bu, the king of Jiujiang, allies with Liu Bang.

====== Northern Asia ======
- The Xiongnu leader, Modu Chanyu, conquers the neighbouring nomadic Yuezhi and Donghu peoples, thereby establishing the Xiongnu Empire. He appoints a Tuqi King of the left (east) and a Tuqi King of the right (west) to prevent rebellions.

=== 204 BC ===
==== By place ====
====== Carthage ======
- Having lost his alliance with the Numidian chief Masinissa, the Carthaginian general, Hasdrubal Gisco, finds a new ally in the Numidian king Syphax, who marries Sophonisba, Hasdrubal's daughter, who, until his defection to Rome, has been betrothed to Masinissa.
- Roman forces under Publius Cornelius Scipio besiege Utica in Carthaginia. Scipio is unable to stop the combined forces of the Carthaginians under Hasdrubal Gisco and the Numidians under their chief, Syphax, and he is forced to lift his siege of Utica.

====== Egypt ======
- The late Egyptian King Ptolemy IV's clique of favourites, led by Sosibius, Ptolemy's chief minister, keeps Ptolemy's death a secret, fearing retribution from the new king Ptolemy V's mother, Queen Arsinoe III. They arrange for the murder of Arsinoe, and then the five-year-old king is officially elevated to the throne with Sosibius as his guardian. Arsinoe has been popular with the Egyptian population so rioting follows the news of her assassination.

====== Roman Republic ======
- The Battle of Crotona is fought between Hannibal's Carthaginian army, and a Roman force led by Publius Sempronius Tuditanus, with no decisive outcome for either side.
- End of the Second Punic War.

====== Seleucid Empire ======
- Philip V of Macedon and Antiochus III of the Syrian-based Seleucid kingdom realize Egypt's weakness and agree to partition Egypt's Anatolian and Aegean possessions. Antiochus' share is to be southern Syria, Lycia, Cilicia and Cyprus, while Philip is to gain western Anatolia and the Cyclades.

====== China ======
- Han Xin completes the conquest of Zhao and receives the surrender of Yan. He captures the Zhao capital of Handan and defeats Chu relief forces sent by Xiang Yu.
- Han Xin invades the State of Qi, defeats Qi's armies, captures their capital Linzi and crushes a coalition army of Chu and Qi forces under Long Ju in the Battle of the Wei River.

=== 203 BC ===
==== By place ====
====== Carthage ======
- The Roman general, Publius Cornelius Scipio, while undertaking peace negotiations with the Carthaginians at Utica, makes a surprise attack on the Carthaginian camp and destroys it. Then, sweeping down on the forces that the Carthaginians and their allies, the Numidians, are trying to muster on the Great Plains near the upper Bagradas River (in modern Tunisia), he smashes that army in the Battle of the Great Plains. The Numidian king, Syphax, and the Carthaginian leader, Hasdrubal Gisco, manage to escape separately.
- The Roman general, Gaius Laelius, and Rome's Numidian ally, Masinissa, follow Syphax towards Cirta, the Numidian capital. In the pursuit, Syphax is captured after his badly wounded horse throws him off. He is delivered to Scipio and is made a prisoner of the Romans, dying in the Italian town of Alba Fucens later in the year.
- Masinissa becomes king of both the Massyli and the Massaesyli tribes in Numidia and remains a loyal ally to the Romans.
- Hasdrubal Gisco persuades the Carthaginians to raise a new army and to send for Hannibal to return home from Italy. Hannibal finally leaves Italy and returns to Carthage.
- The Carthaginian general, Mago Barca, is defeated and wounded by the Romans in the Battle of Insubria. He dies of his wounds on the return voyage to Carthage.
- A preliminary armistice between Carthage and Rome is declared and the Carthaginian armies accept Scipio's severe terms. However, on his return to Carthage, Hannibal concentrates the remnants of the Carthaginian forces at Hadrumetum (modern Sousse, Tunisia) and prepares them for battle.

====== China ======
- Han Xin completes the conquest of Qi, and Liu Bang appoints him as its king.
- After Xiang Yu fails to persuade Han Xin to remain neutral, Han Xin and Liu Bang launch a five-pronged invasion of Chu. They decisively defeat Xiang Yu in the Battle of Chen and the Battle of Gaixia.
- Xiang Yu flees toward Wuyue and, pursued by Han cavalry, commits suicide.

=== 202 BC ===
==== By place ====
====== Carthage ======
- Accused of treason by the Carthaginians after being defeated by the Romans at the Battle of the Great Plains, Hasdrubal Gisco commits suicide to avoid being lynched by a Carthaginian mob.
- October 19 – The Battle of Zama (130 kilometers south-west of Carthage) ends the Second Punic War and largely destroys the power of Carthage. Roman and Numidian forces under the leadership of the Roman general Publius Cornelius Scipio and his Numidian ally, Masinissa, defeat a combined army of Carthaginians and their Numidian allies under the command of Hannibal and force Carthage to capitulate. Hannibal loses 20,000 men in the defeat, but he is able to escape Masinissa's pursuit.

====== Roman Republic ======
- Following the Battle of Zama, the Roman general Publius Cornelius Scipio gains the cognomen "Africanus" in honour of his feats in North Africa against Carthage.

====== Egypt ======
- The Egyptian regent and chief minister, Sosibius, retires and Agathocles, another member of the ruling clique, becomes Ptolemy V's guardian.
- Agathocles rule provokes Tlepolemus, the governor of Pelusium (Egypt's eastern frontier city), into action. Tlepolemus marches on Alexandria, where his supporters rouse a mob, compelling Agathocles to resign.
- The Egyptian boy king, Ptolemy V, is encouraged by a mob clamouring for revenge against the murderers of his mother Arsinoe III to agree to Agathocles being killed. As a result, the mob searches out and butchers Agathocles and his family. Tlepolemus takes Agathocles' place as regent. However, he soon proves to be incompetent and is removed.
- During this period of confusion and change amongst Egypt’s leadership, armies under the Seleucid king, Antiochus III, make serious inroads into the Egyptian territories in Coele-Syria.

====== China ======
- Liu Bang and Han Xin defeat the remaining loyalists of Xiang Yu.
- 28 February: Liu Bang declares himself Supreme Emperor of China, officially beginning the Han dynasty.
- Liu Bang appoints Han Xin the king of Chu, but he deposes him later in the year after accusing him of disloyalty.
- The construction of the new Chinese capital Chang'an begins.
- Liu Bang gives the area of today's Fujian province to Wuzhu as his kingdom. Wuzhu starts the construction of his own capital Ye (Fuzhou).
- The construction of Changsha begins.
- The armies of Han, led by Fan Kuai, suppress a rebellion by the State of Yan, defeating its king Zang Tu.

=== 201 BC ===
==== By place ====
====== Carthage ======
- On Hannibal's advice, Carthage sues for peace with the Romans, ending the Second Punic War. Carthage is reduced to a client state of Rome. In the peace treaty between Carthage and Rome, Carthage surrenders all her Mediterranean possessions to Rome, including her Iberian territories. The Carthaginians agree to pay Rome 200 talents per year for 50 years, allow Masinissa to rule Numidia as an independent kingdom, make no war without Rome's permission, and destroy all but 10 of the Carthaginian warships.
- Following the conclusion of the peace with Rome, Hannibal is elected as suffet, or chief magistrate, of Carthage. The office has over the years become insignificant in Carthaginian politics, but Hannibal restores its power and authority. He sets out to reform the administration and finances of Carthage and reduce the power of the oligarchy which has ruled Carthage before and during the Second Punic War.

====== Roman Republic ======
- The Romans oust the Carthaginians from Malta.
- In Rome, according to the Roman historian Livy, land is distributed to veterans of the Second Punic War. This is the first documented instance of a practice that later becomes commonplace.

====== Greece ======
- Philip V of Macedon captures Samos and the Egyptian fleet stationed there. He then besieges Chios to the north.
- Rhodes and its allies Pergamum, Cyzicus, and Byzantium combine their fleets and defeat Philip V in the Battle of Chios. His flagship is trapped and rammed by two enemy ships.
- The Spartan king, Nabis, once more invades and captures Messene. However, the Spartans are forced to retreat when the Achaean League army of Philopoemen intervenes. Nabis' forces are decisively defeated at Tegea by Philopoemen and Nabis is forced to check his expansionist ambitions for the time being.

====== China ======
- The construction of city walls around Nanchang begins.
- King Xin of Han, in alliance with Modu Chanyu of the Xiongnu, launches a rebellion against the Han dynasty in the Taiyuan Commandery. He is defeated by Emperor Gaozu of Han and his generals, who chase Xin of Han into Xiongnu territory.

=== 200 BC ===
==== By place ====
====== Seleucid Empire ======
- Antiochus III's forces continue their invasion of Coele Syria and Palestine.
- Conquest of Armenia by the Seleucids.

====== Greece ======
- Philip V of Macedon's fleet defeat the Rhodians at Lade. His forces then advance into Pergamum, plundering Pergamese territory and attacking cities in Caria.
- The Acarnanians, with Macedonian support, invade Attica, causing Athens, which has previously maintained its neutrality, to seek help from the enemies of Philip. Attalus I of Pergamum, who is with his fleet at Aegina, receives an embassy from Athens asking him to come to the city for consultations. After he is told that Roman ambassadors are also in Athens, Attalus goes there in haste.
- The Roman ambassador to Greece, Syria, and Egypt, Marcus Aemilius Lepidus delivers an ultimatum to Philip V warning Macedonia not to make war on any Greek state. Philip decides to reject the Roman ultimatum and the Romans declare war on Macedon, thus starting the Second Macedonian War.
- The Roman consul, Publius Sulpicius Galba Maximus, asks Attalus I and his fleet to meet up with the Roman fleet off the Greek Aegean coast and they conduct a naval campaign against Philip V, harassing Macedonian possessions in and along the Aegean.

====== Bactria ======
- Euthydemus I of the Greco-Bactrian Kingdom dies and is succeeded by his son Demetrius I of Bactria (approximate date).

====== South America ======
- The city of Tiwanaku is founded as a village near Lake Titicaca in modern Bolivia (approximate date).
- The Early Horizon period in the Andes comes to an end as the Chavin culture vanishes and is succeeded by the Nazca culture (approximate date).

====== China ======
- Chinese create a padding material.
- The construction of the Wei-Yang Palace in the Han dynasty capital (Chang'an) begins.
- The Han emperor Gaozu is defeated by the Xiongnu, led by Modu Chanyu, in the Battle of Baideng.

==== By topic ====
====== Art ======
- Alexander the Great, head from a Hellenistic copy of a statue, possibly after a 4th century BC original by Lysippos is made. It is now kept at the Archeological Museum in Istanbul, Turkey.
- Lost-wax casting is known in China and Mesopotamia (approximate date).
- Roman artists begin attempting to produce the illusion of thin slabs of colored marble covering the walls, which are set off by actual architectural moldings and columns, in private houses. These attempts last for 120 years.

====== Astronomy ======
- The first good measurement of the distance between Earth and the Sun is made by Eratosthenes (approximate date). By studying lunar eclipses, his result is roughly 150 000 000 km. The currently accepted value is 149 597 870 691 ± 30 metres.

== Births ==
208 BC

- Liu Ruyi, Chinese prince and only son of the first Han emperor Liu Bang (d. 194 BC)
- Polybius, Greek historian, famous for his book called "The Histories" or "The Rise of the Roman Empire", covering in detail the period between 220 and 146 BC (d. 120 BC)

200 BC

- Chao Cuo, Chinese political advisor and official (approximate date)
- Gongsun Hong, Chinese statesman and chancellor (d. 121 BC)
- Jia Yi, Chinese statesman and poet (d. 170 BC)
- Wen, Chinese emperor of the Han dynasty (d. 157 BC)

== Deaths ==
209 BC

- Touman, chanyu of the Xiongnu Empire. (Killed by his successor)

208 BC

- Marcus Claudius Marcellus, Roman general who has captured Syracuse during the Second Punic War and has become known as "the sword of Rome" (b. 268 BC)
- Li Si, Chinese philosopher and politician (assassinated) (b. 280 BC)

207 BC

- June 22 – Hasdrubal Barca, Carthaginian general in the Second Punic War (b. 245 BC)
- date unknown
  - An Dương Vương, King of Nam Việt since 257 BC
  - Chrysippus, Greek philosopher from Soloi who was the principal systematiser of Stoic philosophy (b. c. 280 BC)
  - Hasdrubal Barca, Carthaginian general who has unsuccessfully attempted to sustain Carthage's military ascendancy on the Spanish peninsula in the face of Roman attacks (b. 245 BC)
  - Machanidas, Spartan general and regent (killed in the battle of Mantinea)
  - Qin Er Shi, Emperor of the Qin dynasty of China (assassinated) (b. 229 BC)
  - Simuka, Indian king from 230 BC and the founder of the Satavahana dynasty (b. 230 BC)
  - Zhao Gao, Chief eunuch in the service of the Emperors of the Qin dynasty of China (assassinated)

206 BC

- Chrysippus, Greek Stoic philosopher (approximate date)
- Han Cheng, Chinese ruler of the Eighteen Kingdoms
- Han Guang, Chinese ruler of the Eighteen Kingdoms
- Scerdilaidas, Illyrian king of the Ardiaean Kingdom
- Yi (or Huai II), Chinese ruler of the Chu State
- Ziying, Chinese ruler of the Qin Dynasty

205 BC

- Ptolemy IV Philopator, Greek king of Egypt who has reigned from 221 BC (b. c. 238 BC)
- Sima Ang, Chinese ruler of the Eighteen Kingdoms
- Zhang Han, Chinese general of the Qin dynasty

204 BC

- Arsinoe III, queen of Egypt, sister and wife of Ptolemy IV (assassinated) (b. c. 246 BC)
- Dong Yi, Chinese general of the Qin Dynasty and conferred with the title of "King of Di"
- Fan Zeng, Chinese adviser during the Chu-Han Contention (206–202 BC) (b. 277 BC)
- Gong Ao, Chinese ruler of the Eighteen Kingdoms during the Chu-Han Contention
- Hanno the Elder, Carthaginian general executed by Scipio Africanus
- Ji Xin, Chinese general during the Chu-Han Contention
- Li Yiji, Chinese politician and adviser (b. 268 BC)
- Long Ju, Chinese general and Grand Marshal
- Ptolemy IV Philopator, king (Pharaoh) of Egypt
- Sima Xin, Chinese general of the Qin Dynasty

203 BC

- Mago Barca, Carthaginian general during the Second Punic War against Rome who has accompanied his brother Hannibal on the invasion of Italy (b. 243 BC)
- Quintus Fabius Maximus Verrucosus, Roman general and statesman whose cautious delaying tactics (which have led to his surname Cunctator, meaning "delayer") during the early stages of the Second Punic War have given Rome time to recover its strength and take the offensive against the invading Carthaginian army of Hannibal (b. c. 275 BC)
- Syphax, Numidian king allied with the Carthaginians during the Second Punic War against Rome

202 BC

- Hasdrubal Gisco, Carthaginian general who has fought against Rome in Iberia and North Africa during the Second Punic War, customarily identified as the son of Gisco (suicide)
- Xiang Yu, rebel leader against the Qin dynasty and nemesis of Liu Bang in the Chu–Han Contention (b. 232 BC)

201 BC

- Gnaeus Naevius, Latin epic poet and dramatist of the Old Latin period, who invented a new genre of written historical plays called fabulae praetextae, which are based on Roman historical or legendary figures and events (b. c. 264 BC).
- Zhongli Mo, Chinese general during the Chu–Han Contention.

200 BC

- Abdissares, king of Sophene (Armenian Kingdom) from 212 BC
- Euthydemus I, king of the Greco-Bactrian Kingdom from 223 BC (approximate date) (b. c. 260 BC)
