= Hydraulic warfare =

Use of water as a weapon

Hydraulic warfare (HW) is the use of surface water from reservoirs, rivers, canals and other waterbodies as a mass destruction/area denial weapon against the operations of an opposing force during a military conflict. This may involve breaching dams and rerouting watercourses to flood and drown the enemy-held regions of the battlefield, and can be used as a measure of area denial to impede the advance of an attacking ground force, or to reduce the logistic resources and tactical options for fortified defenders. The technique has been used throughout history to create "devastating floods, isolate troops, cut off supply lines, hinder river crossings, and disrupt military timetables".

The English term originated in the 1950s, with the US Army Corps of Engineers.

== History ==
=== China ===
Hydraulic warfare had been used numerous times in Ancient China at least as early as late Spring and Autumn period (770 BC – c. 481 BC), typically as a form of siege warfare against heavy fortifications or in annihilation battles against enemy forces in depressed locations.

- In 454 BC, Zhi Yao, the most powerful oligarch of the state of Jin, laid siege to Jinyang (晉陽, modern-day Taiyuan, Shanxi), the home city of the defiant Zhao clan, by diverting the Fen River to inundate the city. However, after he boasted the misery inflicted on the people of Jinyang and revelled at the prospect of doing the same attack again in the future, his two ally clans Wei and Han (who feared that Zhi would eventually turn on them) decided to switch allegiance and help the Zhao clan. The new alliance then captured the dam controlling the flood and instead redirected the water towards Zhi Yao's camp, defeating and killing him.
- In 279 BC, Qin generals Bai Qi and Zhang Ruo launched amphibious assaults on the southern state of Chu from two different fronts, capturing Chu's then-capital Yan (鄢, modern-day Yicheng, Hubei), during which Bai Qi flooded the city with a redirected river, drowning hundreds of thousands of people.
- In 225 BC during Qin's wars of unification, the Qin general Wang Ben led 600,000 troops to besiege the Wei capital Daliang (大梁, modern-day Kaifeng, Henan), which was situated at the confluence of two rivers and the Hong Canal, feeding the city's deep moats and giving it a natural defensive advantage. Wang Ben spent three months redirecting the waters from the Yellow River and the Hong Canal to flood Daliang, drowning over 100,000 people and forcing King Jia of Wei to surrender.
- In 204 BC during the Chu-Han contention, Han general Han Xin defeated a 200,000-strong Western Chu army led by Long Ju at the Battle of Wei River, by feigning retreat and luring the pursuing enemy to ford the Wei River (潍水, at modern-day Weifang, Shandong), before releasing water held back by a makeshift sandbag dam/weir to trap and drown the Chu army.
- In early 199 AD during the end of the Han dynasty, warlord Cao Cao besieged Lü Bu's last stronghold at the Battle of Xiapi by rerouting river and flooding the city of Xiapi (下邳, modern-day Pizhou, Jiangsu), forcing the latter to surrender.
- In 219 AD just prior to the Three Kingdoms period, Shu general Guan Yu, despite being outnumbered two-to-one, annihilated the Wei vanguard led by generals Yu Jin and Pang De at the early phase of the Battle of Fancheng by taking advantage of the Han River flood caused by heavy rains.
- In 622 AD during the Sui-Tang transition, Tang prince-general Li Shimin defeated the rebel lord Liu Heita at the Battle of Mingshui (洺水, modern-day Quzhou County, Hebei) by building and then breaching a temporary weir.

In 1938 during the Second Sino-Japanese War, the Nationalist Government of the Republic of China breached the dikes of the Yellow River at Huayuankou, Henan in a desperate act of scorched earth defense to slow down the advance of the invading Imperial Japanese Army. The subsequent flood, which collaterally killed between 400,000 and 500,000 civilians downstream via drowning, displacement, famine and plague, became known as the largest such act in history.

=== Europe ===
In the year 70, during the Revolt of the Batavi, the Batavi built dams in the river Rhine to flood fields during a battle against Roman forces.

Between the years 1500 and 2000, some 1/3 of floods in the Netherlands southwest were deliberately caused during wartime. The tactic was typically ineffective, and had damaged the land and local population.

HW was used by Finland and the USSR during World War II. British forces destroyed the Moehne and Edersee Dams in Western Germany to cut off the supply of water, power, river navigation, and flood protection to the Nazi regime. The breach of the Moehne dam unleashed a flood of 310,000 cfs, costing 1,200 lives. Bridges were washed out for 30 miles below the dam, and two power plants were submerged. The destruction of the Edersse dam produced similar flows and damaged infrastructure all the way to the Mittelland canal. Navigation was also disrupted as no water was available to stabilize the level of water in the river. Germany struck again by flooding the Pontine marshes in Italy, slowing the advance of Allied forces. Germany flooded the Ay and Ill rivers in France and the Rur river in Germany, also flooded the Liri, Garigliano and Rapido Rivers in Italy in early 1944. The Garigliano flood disrupted a British crossing, with knock-on effects on the Battle of Monte Cassino. Conversely, the Germans dammed up the Rapido river below an attempted crossing, creating a quagmire and delaying the operation. During the Normandy campaign, the Allied forces attacking Utah Beach suffered significant setbacks due to the Germans deliberately flooded seawater into the fields up to 2 miles (3.2 km) from the coast, forcing Allied vehicles to be funnelled onto the few remaining dry causeways that were specifically targeted by German artilleries.

In 2022 and 2023, the appearance of flooded areas indicated the use of HW during the Russian invasion of Ukraine.

== Sources ==
- Li, Bo; Zheng, Yin (2001), 《中华五千年》 [5000 years of Chinese History] (in Chinese), Inner Mongolian People's publishing, ISBN 7-204-04420-7
- Whitmarsh, Andrew (2009). D-Day in Photographs. Stroud: History Press. ISBN 978-0-7524-5095-7.
