= 204 BC =

204 BC in various calendars
- Gregorian calendar: 204 BC; CCIV BC
- Ab urbe condita: 550
- Ancient Egypt era: XXXIII dynasty, 120
- Pharaoh: Ptolemy IV Philopator, 18
- Ancient Greek Olympiad (summer): 144th Olympiad (victor)¹
- Assyrian calendar: 4547
- Balinese saka calendar: N/A
- Bengali calendar: −797 – −796
- Berber calendar: 747
- Buddhist calendar: 341
- Burmese calendar: −841
- Byzantine calendar: 5305–5306
- Chinese calendar: 丙申年 (Fire Monkey); 2494 or 2287 — to — 丁酉年 (Fire Rooster); 2495 or 2288
- Coptic calendar: −487 – −486
- Discordian calendar: 963
- Ethiopian calendar: −211 – −210
- Hebrew calendar: 3557–3558
- Hindu calendars
- Vikram Samvat: −147 – −146
- Shaka Samvat: N/A
- Kali Yuga: 2897–2898
- Holocene calendar: 9797
- Iranian calendar: 825 BP – 824 BP
- Islamic calendar: 850 BH – 849 BH
- Javanese calendar: N/A
- Julian calendar: N/A
- Korean calendar: 2130
- Minguo calendar: 2115 before ROC 民前2115年
- Nanakshahi calendar: −1671
- Seleucid era: 108/109 AG
- Thai solar calendar: 339–340
- Tibetan calendar: མེ་ཕོ་སྤྲེ་ལོ་ (male Fire-Monkey) −77 or −458 or −1230 — to — མེ་མོ་བྱ་ལོ་ (female Fire-Bird) −76 or −457 or −1229

Year 204 BC was a year of the pre-Julian Roman calendar. At the time it was known as the Year of the Consulship of Cethegus and Tuditanus (or, less frequently, year 550 Ab urbe condita). The denomination 204 BC for this year has been used since the early medieval period, when the Anno Domini calendar era became the prevalent method in Europe for naming years.

== Events ==
=== By place ===
==== Carthage ====
- Having lost his alliance with the Numidian chief Masinissa, the Carthaginian general, Hasdrubal Gisco, finds a new ally in the Numidian king Syphax, who marries Sophonisba, Hasdrubal's daughter, who, until his defection to Rome, has been betrothed to Masinissa.
- Roman forces under Publius Cornelius Scipio besiege Utica in Carthaginia. Scipio is unable to stop the combined forces of the Carthaginians under Hasdrubal Gisco and the Numidians under their chief, Syphax, and he is forced to lift his siege of Utica.

==== Egypt ====
- The late Egyptian King Ptolemy IV's clique of favourites, led by Sosibius, Ptolemy's chief minister, keeps Ptolemy's death a secret, fearing retribution from the new king Ptolemy V's mother, Queen Arsinoe III. They arrange for the murder of Arsinoe, and then the five-year-old king is officially elevated to the throne with Sosibius as his guardian. Arsinoe has been popular with the Egyptian population so rioting follows the news of her assassination.

==== Roman Republic ====
- The Battle of Crotona is fought between Hannibal's Carthaginian army, and a Roman force led by Publius Sempronius Tuditanus, with no decisive outcome for either side.

==== Seleucid Empire ====
- Philip V of Macedon and Antiochus III of the Syrian-based Seleucid kingdom realize Egypt's weakness and agree to partition Egypt's Anatolian and Aegean possessions. Antiochus' share is to be southern Syria, Lycia, Cilicia and Cyprus, while Philip is to gain western Anatolia and the Cyclades.

==== China ====
- Han Xin completes the conquest of Zhao and receives the surrender of Yan. He captures the Zhao capital of Handan and defeats Chu relief forces sent by Xiang Yu.
- Han Xin invades the State of Qi, defeats Qi's armies, captures their capital Linzi and crushes a coalition army of Chu and Qi forces under Long Ju in the Battle of the Wei River.

== Deaths ==
- Arsinoe III, queen of Egypt, sister and wife of Ptolemy IV (assassinated) (b. c. 246 BC)
- Dong Yi, Chinese general of the Qin Dynasty and conferred with the title of "King of Di"
- Fan Zeng, Chinese adviser during the Chu-Han Contention (206–202 BC) (b. 277 BC)
- Gong Ao, Chinese ruler of the Eighteen Kingdoms during the Chu-Han Contention
- Hanno the Elder, Carthaginian general executed by Scipio Africanus
- Ji Xin, Chinese general during the Chu-Han Contention
- Li Yiji, Chinese politician and adviser (b. 268 BC)
- Long Ju, Chinese general and grand marshal
- Ptolemy IV Philopator, king (Pharaoh) of Egypt
- Sima Xin, Chinese general of the Qin Dynasty
