= 202 BC =

202 BC in various calendars
Gregorian calendar	202 BC; CCII BC
Ab urbe condita	552
Ancient Egypt era	XXXIII dynasty, 122
Pharaoh	Ptolemy V Epiphanes, 2
Ancient Greek Olympiad (summer)	144th Olympiad, year 3
Assyrian calendar	4549
Balinese saka calendar	N/A
Bengali calendar	−795 – −794
Berber calendar	749
Buddhist calendar	343
Burmese calendar	−839
Byzantine calendar	5307–5308
Chinese calendar	戊戌年 (Earth Dog); 2496 or 2289 — to — 己亥年 (Earth Pig); 2497 or 2290
Coptic calendar	−485 – −484
Discordian calendar	965
Ethiopian calendar	−209 – −208
Hebrew calendar	3559–3560
- Hindu calendars
Vikram Samvat	−145 – −144
Shaka Samvat	N/A
Kali Yuga	2899–2900
Holocene calendar	9799
Iranian calendar	823 BP – 822 BP
Islamic calendar	848 BH – 847 BH
Javanese calendar	N/A
Julian calendar	N/A
Korean calendar	2132
Minguo calendar	2113 before ROC 民前2113年
Nanakshahi calendar	−1669
Seleucid era	110/111 AG
Thai solar calendar	341–342
Tibetan calendar	阳土狗年 (male Earth-Dog) −75 or −456 or −1228 — to — 阴土猪年 (female Earth-Pig) −74 or −455 or −1227

Year 202 BC was a year of the pre-Julian Roman calendar. At the time it was known as the Year of the Consulship of Geminus and Nero (or, less frequently, year 552 Ab urbe condita). The denomination 202 BC for this year has been used since the early medieval period, when the Anno Domini calendar era became the prevalent method in Europe for naming years.

== Events ==
=== By place ===
==== Carthage ====
- Accused of treason by the Carthaginians after being defeated by the Romans at the Battle of the Great Plains, Hasdrubal Gisco commits suicide to avoid being lynched by a Carthaginian mob.
- October 19 – The Battle of Zama (130 kilometers south-west of Carthage) ends the Second Punic War and largely destroys the power of Carthage. Roman and Numidian forces under the leadership of the Roman general Publius Cornelius Scipio and his Numidian ally, Masinissa, defeat a combined army of Carthaginians and their Numidian allies under the command of Hannibal and force Carthage to capitulate. Hannibal loses 20,000 men in the defeat, but he is able to escape Masinissa's pursuit.

==== Roman Republic ====
- Following the Battle of Zama, the Roman general Publius Cornelius Scipio gains the cognomen "Africanus" in honour of his feats in North Africa against Carthage.

==== Egypt ====
- The Egyptian regent and chief minister, Sosibius, retires and Agathocles, another member of the ruling clique, becomes Ptolemy V's guardian.
- Agathocles rule provokes Tlepolemus, the governor of Pelusium (Egypt's eastern frontier city), into action. Tlepolemus marches on Alexandria, where his supporters rouse a mob, compelling Agathocles to resign.
- The Egyptian boy king, Ptolemy V, is encouraged by a mob clamouring for revenge against the murderers of his mother Arsinoe III to agree to Agathocles being killed. As a result, the mob searches out and butchers Agathocles and his family. Tlepolemus takes Agathocles' place as regent. However, he soon proves to be incompetent and is removed.
- During this period of confusion and change amongst Egypt’s leadership, armies under the Seleucid king, Antiochus III, make serious inroads into the Egyptian territories in Coele-Syria.

==== China ====
- Liu Bang and Han Xin defeat the remaining loyalists of Xiang Yu.
- 28 February: Liu Bang declares himself Supreme Emperor of China, officially beginning the Han dynasty.
- Liu Bang appoints Han Xin the king of Chu, but he deposes him later in the year after accusing him of disloyalty.
- The construction of the new Chinese capital Chang'an begins.
- Liu Bang gives the area of today's Fujian province to Wuzhu as his kingdom. Wuzhu starts the construction of his own capital Ye (Fuzhou).
- The construction of Changsha begins.
- The armies of Han, led by Fan Kuai, suppress a rebellion by the State of Yan, defeating its king Zang Tu.

== Deaths ==
- Hasdrubal Gisco, Carthaginian general who has fought against Rome in Iberia and North Africa during the Second Punic War, customarily identified as the son of Gisco (suicide)
- Xiang Yu, rebel leader against the Qin dynasty and nemesis of Liu Bang in the Chu–Han Contention (b. 232 BC)
