= Aristomenes of Alyzeia =

Aristomenes of Alyzeia or Aristomenes the Acarnanian (Ancient Greek: Ἀριστομένης; born 3rd century BC; died 2nd century BC) was regent and chief minister of Egypt in the Ptolemaic period during the reign of the boy king Ptolemy V and a friend and flatterer of Agathocles.

Aristomenes, son of Menneas, was a native of the city of Alyzeia in Acarnania, Greece. He migrated to Egypt some time after 216 BC and became regent Priest of Alexander in 204/3 BC.

During Agathocles' regency, Aristomenes was very powerful. His displays of admiration for the vice-king were evident and provocative: for instance, he wore a ring bearing the image of the vice-king, and named his daughter Agathocleia. When a rebellion against Agathocles broke out in 202 BC, Aristomenes was the only one among his friends who tried to pacify the enraged Macedonians but failed, narrowly escaping death. After the execution of Agathocles (who was torn apart by the furious crowd during the rebellion), Tlepolemus, a military leader who led the uprising, was appointed regent.

He supplanted Tlepolemus in 201 BC as regent of the underage king and unexpectedly distinguished himself with the wisdom and prudence with which he exercised power. During his time at the head of the state, two powerful military figures, Scopas and Dicaearchus, who claimed the throne, sparked a revolutionary movement, resulting in their execution.

This event, to prevent another uprising, forced Aristomenes to initiate the "anaklētēria" - the coming of age and declaration of King Ptolemy V, who was then 13 or 14 years old, as ruler in 196 BC. Aristomenes took personal control of the kingdom and remained chief minister; this was his role when the "Memphis Decree" (recorded on the Rosetta Stone) was issued in March 196. After these events, Aristomenes was highly honored by the King and served as an open and honest advisor.

However, his excessive frankness gradually led to disfavor with the King. Eventually, in a moment of outrage, the young King could not restrain himself and ordered Aristomenes to drink poison in 192 BC.

== Sources ==
=== Primary sources ===
- Polybius, xv.25, 31

=== Secondary works ===
- Edwyn Bevan, The House of Ptolemy, Chapter 7, passim
- Walter Ameling, "Aristomenes [2]" in Der neue Pauly vol. 1 pp. 1115–1116
- William Smith, Dictionary of Greek and Roman Biography and Mythology, (1870), archived from the original on 2009-06-27
- Drandakis. Μεγάλη Ελληνική Εγκυκλοπαίδεια Δρανδάκη (Great Greek Encyclopedia by Drandakis) (in Greek). vol. E, p. 510.
