= Agathoclea (mistress) =

3rd-century BC Egyptian royal mistress

Agathoclea (Greek: Ἀγαθόκλεια; c. 247 BC/mid-230s BC – 203/202) was the favourite mistress of the Greco-Egyptian Pharaoh Ptolemy IV Philopator who reigned 221–205; sister of Ptolemy IV’s minister Agathocles.

Agathoclea was an Egyptian noblewoman. She was one of the daughters born to Oenanthe of Egypt. The name of her father is uncertain. Polybius states Agathoclea had relatives who served the Ptolemaic dynasty: Nikon a nauarch under Ptolemy IV; and Philammon who was appointed libyarch of Cyrene by her brother.

Agathoclea may have been an owner of a grain boat. Agathoclea and her brother, who both exercised almost unlimited influence over the Pharaoh, were introduced to him by their ambitious mother. Polybius (15.31.13), states that Agathoclea claimed to have a wet-nurse to the son of Ptolemy IV. Despite Ptolemy IV marrying his sister Arsinoe III in 220 BC, Agathoclea continued to be his favourite. In late c. 210 BC, Agathoclea may have given birth to a son from her affair with Ptolemy IV, who may have died shortly after his birth, and it has also been suggested that Ptolemy V was in fact born of Agathoclea.

On the death of Ptolemy IV in 205, Agathoclea and her friends kept the event secret, that they might have an opportunity of plundering the royal treasury. They also formed a conspiracy with Sosibius aimed at placing Agathocles on the throne or at least making him regent for the new king, Ptolemy V Epiphanes. With the support of Sosibios, they murdered Arsinoe III. Agathocles then acted as guardian to the young king Ptolemy V.

In 203/202, the Egyptians and Greeks of Alexandria, exasperated at Agathocles' outrages, rose against him, and the military governor Tlepolemus placed himself at their head. They surrounded the palace in the night, and forced their way in. Agathocles and his sister begged for mercy, but in vain. Agathocles was killed by his friends, to avoid an even more cruel fate. Agathoclea with her sisters, and Oenanthe, who had taken refuge in a temple, were dragged out, and in a state of nakedness exposed to the fury of the multitude, who literally tore them limb from limb. All their relations and those who had had any share in the murder of Arsinoe III were likewise put to death.

There was another Agathoclea, the daughter of a man named Aristomenes, who was by birth an Acarnanian, and rose to great power in Egypt.

== Ancestry ==
Ancestors of Agathoclea (mistress)

2. Agathocles
10. Agathocles of Syracuse, Tyrant of Syracuse
5. Theoxena of Egypt
22. Philip
11. Theoxena of Syracuse
23. Berenice I of Egypt
1. Agathoclea
3. Oenanthe of Egypt
