= Sosibius of Tarentum =

Sosibius (Greek: Σωσίβιoς; lived 3rd century BC) was a Tarentine from Magna Graecia, one of the captains of the bodyguards of Ptolemy Philadelphus (283–246 BC), king of Egypt. It is not improbable that he may have been the father of Sosibius, the chief minister of Ptolemy Philopator (221–204 BC).
