= Oenanthe of Egypt =

3rd-century BC Egyptian Greek noblewoman

Oenanthe (Greek: Οἰνἀνθη, which means wineflower - from οἶνος wine and ἄνθος flower), who died in 203 BC, was an Egyptian Greek noblewoman who, through marriage, was a relation of the Ptolemaic dynasty.

She was a woman of obscure origins. She had married (at an unknown date) Agathocles, an Egyptian Greek nobleman. (Her husband's maternal grandfather, Agathocles of Syracuse, had ruled as the Greek Tyrant of Syracuse in Sicily from 317 to 289 BC and became king of much of Sicily; her husband's maternal grandmother, Theoxena of Syracuse, a Greek Macedonian noblewoman, was the second older maternal half-sister of the Greek-Egyptian Pharaoh Ptolemy II Philadelphus, who reigned from 284 to 246 BC.) Oenanthe bore Agathocles four children: one son, Agathocles; one daughter, called Agathoclea; and another two daughters whose names are unknown.

Oenanthe's husband Agathocles died at an unknown date, and she later married Theogenes, sometimes known as Theognetos or Diognetos. Theogenes was a prominent Egyptian Greek dioiketes who managed a private estate.

Oenanthe had an ambitious and avaricious character. She introduced her offspring Agathoclea and Agathocles to the Egyptian-Greek Pharaoh Ptolemy IV Philopator, who reigned from 221 BC to 205 BC. Through her children she exerted great influence over the Egyptian government in the reign of Ptolemy IV. Agathoclea became the favourite mistress of Ptolemy IV and, later, Agathocles became the regent and guardian of Ptolemy IV’s child, Ptolemy V Epiphanes.

Oenanthe’s influence only lasted until Ptolemy IV died. In 205 BC, after the accession of the young Ptolemy V, the citizens of Alexandria rose up against Oenanthe, her family and their party, who fled for refuge to the temple of the Thesmophorium. They hoped the aid of the goddesses and their enchantments would drive away the threats and curses. Some noble ladies had come to console her.

The next day Oenanthe, her family and their party were dragged out from the altar by the Alexandrians and brought naked on horse-back to the stadium, where they were all murdered, being torn into pieces.

== Sources ==
- Ancient Library article: Agathoclea
- Ancient Library article: Oenanthe
- Ptolemaic Genealogy: Agathoclea
- Ptolemaic Dynasty - Affiliated Lines: Agathocles
- Ptolemaic Genealogy: Berenice I
- Ptolemaic Genealogy: Theoxena
