= 178 BC =

178 BC in various calendars
- Gregorian calendar: 178 BC; CLXXVIII BC
- Ab urbe condita: 576
- Ancient Egypt era: XXXIII dynasty, 146
- Pharaoh: Ptolemy VI Philometor, 3
- Ancient Greek Olympiad (summer): 150th Olympiad, year 3
- Assyrian calendar: 4573
- Balinese saka calendar: N/A
- Bengali calendar: −771 – −770
- Berber calendar: 773
- Buddhist calendar: 367
- Burmese calendar: −815
- Byzantine calendar: 5331–5332
- Chinese calendar: 壬戌年 (Water Dog); 2520 or 2313 — to — 癸亥年 (Water Pig); 2521 or 2314
- Coptic calendar: −461 – −460
- Discordian calendar: 989
- Ethiopian calendar: −185 – −184
- Hebrew calendar: 3583–3584
- Hindu calendars
- Vikram Samvat: −121 – −120
- Shaka Samvat: N/A
- Kali Yuga: 2923–2924
- Holocene calendar: 9823
- Iranian calendar: 799 BP – 798 BP
- Islamic calendar: 824 BH – 823 BH
- Javanese calendar: N/A
- Julian calendar: N/A
- Korean calendar: 2156
- Minguo calendar: 2089 before ROC 民前2089年
- Nanakshahi calendar: −1645
- Seleucid era: 134/135 AG
- Thai solar calendar: 365–366
- Tibetan calendar: ཆུ་ཕོ་ཁྱི་ལོ་ (male Water-Dog) −51 or −432 or −1204 — to — ཆུ་མོ་ཕག་ལོ་ (female Water-Boar) −50 or −431 or −1203

Year 178 BC was a year of the pre-Julian Roman calendar. At the time it was known as the Year of the Consulship of Brutus and Vulso (or, less frequently, year 576 Ab urbe condita). The denomination 178 BC for this year has been used since the early medieval period, when the Anno Domini calendar era became the prevalent method in Europe for naming years.

== Events ==
=== By place ===
==== Roman Republic ====
- In Rome, the praetor Lucius Postumius Albinus celebrates a triumph after conquering the Vaccaei and Lusitani during his time as Roman commander in the province of Hispania Ulterior.

==== Greece ====
- One of Perseus' first acts on becoming king of Macedonia is to renew the treaty between Macedonia and Rome. In the meantime, Perseus builds up the Macedonian army and puts out feelers for creating an alliance with the Greek leagues, with his northern barbarian neighbours, and also with the Seleucid king Seleucus IV.

== Deaths ==
- Chen Ping, Chinese official and chancellor of the Western Han dynasty
- Fu Sheng (Master Fu), Chinese Confucian scholar and writer (b. 268 BC)
- Liu Jiao, Chinese prince and younger brother of Emperor Gaozu of Han
