= 246 BC =

246 BC in various calendars
- Gregorian calendar: 246 BC; CCXLVI BC
- Ab urbe condita: 508
- Ancient Egypt era: XXXIII dynasty, 78
- Pharaoh: Ptolemy III Euergetes, 1
- Ancient Greek Olympiad (summer): 133rd Olympiad, year 3
- Assyrian calendar: 4505
- Balinese saka calendar: N/A
- Bengali calendar: −839 – −838
- Berber calendar: 705
- Buddhist calendar: 299
- Burmese calendar: −883
- Byzantine calendar: 5263–5264
- Chinese calendar: 甲寅年 (Wood Tiger); 2452 or 2245 — to — 乙卯年 (Wood Rabbit); 2453 or 2246
- Coptic calendar: −529 – −528
- Discordian calendar: 921
- Ethiopian calendar: −253 – −252
- Hebrew calendar: 3515–3516
- Hindu calendars
- Vikram Samvat: −189 – −188
- Shaka Samvat: N/A
- Kali Yuga: 2855–2856
- Holocene calendar: 9755
- Iranian calendar: 867 BP – 866 BP
- Islamic calendar: 894 BH – 893 BH
- Javanese calendar: N/A
- Julian calendar: N/A
- Korean calendar: 2088
- Minguo calendar: 2157 before ROC 民前2157年
- Nanakshahi calendar: −1713
- Seleucid era: 66/67 AG
- Thai solar calendar: 297–298
- Tibetan calendar: ཤིང་ཕོ་སྟག་ལོ་ (male Wood-Tiger) −119 or −500 or −1272 — to — ཤིང་མོ་ཡོས་ལོ་ (female Wood-Hare) −118 or −499 or −1271

Year 246 BC was a year of the pre-Julian Roman calendar. At the time it was known as the Year of the Consulship of Crassus and Licinus (or, less frequently, year 508 Ab urbe condita). The denomination 246 BC for this year has been used since the early medieval period, when the Anno Domini calendar era became the prevalent method in Europe for naming years.

== Events ==
=== By place ===
==== Egypt ====
- Egypt's Ptolemy II dies and is succeeded by his son, Ptolemy III. At the time of Ptolemy II's death, Egypt comprises the ancient kingdom of Egypt in the Nile Valley, Cyrene, Judea and the coast of southern Syria, Cyprus and a number of cities on the shores and islands of the Aegean Sea. The Macedonian Ptolemies maintain their authority over their territories with a small mercenary army made up of Macedonians and other Greeks.

==== India ====
- The Ashokan pillar in Lauriya, Nandangarh (from the Maurya period) is made.

==== Seleucid Empire ====
- Antiochus II leaves Berenice in order to live again with his former wife Laodice and his son Seleucus. However, Laodice poisons him and proclaims her son as King Seleucus II Callinicus, while her supporters in Antioch kill Berenice and her children who have taken refuge at Daphne, near Antioch, in Syria.
- Berenice's brother, Ptolemy III, sets about to avenge his sister's murder by invading Syria which begins the Third Syrian War (also known as the Laodicean War). Ptolemy III's navy, perhaps with the aid of rebels in the cities, advances against Seleucus II's forces as far as Thrace, across the Hellespont, and also captures some islands off the Anatolian coast.
- Ptolemy III wins major victories over Seleucus II in Syria and Anatolia and briefly occupies Antioch. These victories are marred by the loss of the Cyclades to Antigonus II Gonatas in the Battle of Andros.
- Seleucus II Callinicus' mother, Laodice attempts to take control over the Seleucid Empire by insisting that Seleucus II make his younger brother, Antiochus Hierax, co-regent and give him all the Seleucid territory in Anatolia. Antiochus promptly declares independence and begins fighting a war with his brother.
- In order to secure the Bactrian King Diodotus' friendship, Seleucus II Callinicus arranges the marriage of one of his sisters to King Diodotus.

==== Roman Republic ====
- With Hamilcar Barca wearing the Romans down in Sicily, the Romans, by private subscription, build another fleet with the aim of regaining command of the sea.
- In Rome, the number of praetors is increased from one to two. The second praetor is appointed to relieve the backlog of judicial business and to give the Republic a magistrate with Imperium who can field an army in an emergency when both consuls are away fighting a war.
- Claudia is convicted of treason and forced to pay a fine.

==== China ====
- The Zhengguo Canal, approximately one hundred miles long, is built across the current-day province of Shaanxi in China, greatly adding to the agricultural productivity of the area and to the military potency of the Qin dynasty.
- The Qin general Meng Ao crushes a revolt in Jinyang.

== Births ==
- Arsinoe III, queen of Egypt from 220 BC, daughter of Ptolemy III and Berenice II (d. 204 BC)

== Deaths ==
- Ptolemy II Philadelphus, king of Egypt from 285 BC, second king of the Ptolemaic dynasty, who has extended his power by skillful diplomacy, developed agriculture and commerce, and made Alexandria a leading centre of the arts and sciences (b. 308 BC)
- Antiochus II Theos, king of the Seleucid dominions in the Middle East from 261 BC. He has spent much of his reign at war with Egypt, recovering much of the territory in Anatolia lost in earlier wars between the Ptolemaic and Seleucid dynasties (b. c. 287 BC)
- Berenice, daughter of Ptolemy II Philadelphus and Arsinoe, wife of the Seleucid ruler Antiochus II Theos, supplanting his first wife, Laodice, whose children she has persuaded him to bar from the succession to the throne in favour of her own.
