= 232 BC =

232 BC in various calendars
| Gregorian calendar | 232 BC; CCXXXII BC |
| Ab urbe condita | 522 |
| Ancient Egypt era | XXXIII dynasty, 92 |
| Pharaoh | Ptolemy III Euergetes, 15 |
| Ancient Greek Olympiad (summer) | 137th Olympiad (victor)¹ |
| Assyrian calendar | 4519 |
| Balinese saka calendar | N/A |
| Bengali calendar | −825 – −824 |
| Berber calendar | 719 |
| Buddhist calendar | 313 |
| Burmese calendar | −869 |
| Byzantine calendar | 5277–5278 |
| Chinese calendar | 戊辰年 (Earth Dragon); 2466 or 2259 — to — 己巳年 (Earth Snake); 2467 or 2260 |
| Coptic calendar | −515 – −514 |
| Discordian calendar | 935 |
| Ethiopian calendar | −239 – −238 |
| Hebrew calendar | 3529–3530 |
- Hindu calendars
| Vikram Samvat | −175 – −174 |
| Shaka Samvat | N/A |
| Kali Yuga | 2869–2870 |
| Holocene calendar | 9769 |
| Iranian calendar | 853 BP – 852 BP |
| Islamic calendar | 879 BH – 878 BH |
| Javanese calendar | N/A |
| Julian calendar | N/A |
| Korean calendar | 2102 |
| Minguo calendar | 2143 before ROC 民前2143年 |
| Nanakshahi calendar | −1699 |
| Seleucid era | 80/81 AG |
| Thai solar calendar | 311–312 |
| Tibetan calendar | ས་ཕོ་འབྲུག་ལོ་ (male Earth-Dragon) −105 or −486 or −1258 — to — ས་མོ་སྦྲུལ་ལོ་ (female Earth-Snake) −104 or −485 or −1257 |

Year 232 BC was a year of the pre-Julian Roman calendar. At the time it was known as the Year of the Consulship of Lepidus and Melleolus (or, less frequently, year 522 Ab urbe condita). The denomination 232 BC for this year has been used since the early medieval period, when the Anno Domini calendar era became the prevalent method in Europe for naming years.

== Events ==
=== By place ===
==== Seleucid Empire ====
- The Seleucid king Seleucus II Callinicus undertakes an expedition into the interior of Iran to try to regain Parthia, but his efforts come to nothing. According to some sources, he is even taken prisoner for several years by the Parthian king, Arsaces I. Other sources mention that he establishes a peace with Arsaces I by recognising his sovereignty over Parthia.

==== Roman Republic ====
- Despite the opposition of the Roman Senate and of his own father, the Roman political leader Gaius Flaminius wins the passage of a measure to distribute land among the plebeians. The Romans decide to parcel out land north of Rome (the Ager Gallicus) into small holdings for its poorer citizens whose farms have fallen into ruin during the First Punic War.

==== China ====
- The king of Qin, Ying Zheng, invites Prince Han Fei, a legalist philosopher and member of the Han royal family, to the Qin court. However, at the instigation of Li Si, he then has him imprisoned and executed as a threat to the state.
- The Zhao general Li Mu defeats the Qin army in the Battle of Fanwu.

=== By topic ===
==== Philosophy ====
- Following the death of his mentor, Cleanthes of Assos, Chrysippus of Soli succeeds him as the third head of the Stoic school. The many writings of Chrysippus, about the Stoic doctrines, will later earn him the title of Second Founder of Stoicism.

== Births ==
- Xiang Yu, Chinese rebel general against the Qin dynasty, as well as the later nemesis of Liu Bang in the civil war of the Chu-Han contention (d. 202 BC)

== Deaths ==
- Ashoka, Indian emperor, who has ruled the Maurya Empire across the Indian subcontinent from 273 BC (b. 304 BC)
- Cleanthes of Assos, Stoic philosopher who has been the head of the Stoic school from 263 BC, after the death of Zeno of Citium (b. c. 301 BC)
