= 277 BC =

277 BC in various calendars
Gregorian calendar	277 BC; CCLXXVII BC
Ab urbe condita	477
Ancient Egypt era	XXXIII dynasty, 47
Pharaoh	Ptolemy II Philadelphus, 7
Ancient Greek Olympiad (summer)	125th Olympiad, year 4
Assyrian calendar	4474
Balinese saka calendar	N/A
Bengali calendar	−870 – −869
Berber calendar	674
Buddhist calendar	268
Burmese calendar	−914
Byzantine calendar	5232–5233
Chinese calendar	癸未年 (Water Goat); 2421 or 2214 — to — 甲申年 (Wood Monkey); 2422 or 2215
Coptic calendar	−560 – −559
Discordian calendar	890
Ethiopian calendar	−284 – −283
Hebrew calendar	3484–3485
- Hindu calendars
Vikram Samvat	−220 – −219
Shaka Samvat	N/A
Kali Yuga	2824–2825
Holocene calendar	9724
Iranian calendar	898 BP – 897 BP
Islamic calendar	926 BH – 925 BH
Javanese calendar	N/A
Julian calendar	N/A
Korean calendar	2057
Minguo calendar	2188 before ROC 民前2188年
Nanakshahi calendar	−1744
Seleucid era	35/36 AG
Thai solar calendar	266–267
Tibetan calendar	阴水羊年 (female Water-Goat) −150 or −531 or −1303 — to — 阳木猴年 (male Wood-Monkey) −149 or −530 or −1302

Year 277 BC was a year of the pre-Julian Roman calendar. At the time it was known as the Year of the Consulship of Rufinus and Brutus (or, less frequently, year 477 Ab urbe condita). The denomination 277 BC for this year has been used since the early medieval period, when the Anno Domini calendar era became the prevalent method in Europe for naming years.

== Events ==
=== By place ===
==== Greece ====
- Antigonus crosses the Hellespont and defeats the Celts under the command of Cerethrius at the Battle of Lysimachia near Lysimachia at the neck of the Thracian Chersonese. After this success, he is acknowledged by the Macedonians as their king.

==== Sicily ====
- Pyrrhus captures Eryx, the strongest Carthaginian fortress in Sicily. This prompts the rest of the Carthaginian-controlled cities in Sicily to defect to Pyrrhus.

==== Italy ====
- Battle of the Cranita Hills: Roman forces are defeated by the Samnites at the Cranita Hills during the Pyrrhic War.
- Consul Publius Cornelius Rufinus campaigns against the Lucanians and the Bruttians and captures Crotone.

== Births ==
- Fan Zeng, Chinese adviser during the Chu-Han Contention (d. 204 BC)

== Deaths ==
- Sosthenes, Macedonian general and king of the Antipatrid Dynasty
