= Baetica =

Baetica may refer to:

- Hispania Baetica: one of three Roman provinces in Spain
- Baetica: a genus of bush crickets containing the single species Baetica ustulata.
