= 268 BC =

268 BC in various calendars
- Gregorian calendar: 268 BC; CCLXVIII BC
- Ab urbe condita: 486
- Ancient Egypt era: XXXIII dynasty, 56
- Pharaoh: Ptolemy II Philadelphus, 16
- Ancient Greek Olympiad (summer): 128th Olympiad (victor)¹
- Assyrian calendar: 4483
- Balinese saka calendar: N/A
- Bengali calendar: −861 – −860
- Berber calendar: 683
- Buddhist calendar: 277
- Burmese calendar: −905
- Byzantine calendar: 5241–5242
- Chinese calendar: 壬辰年 (Water Dragon); 2430 or 2223 — to — 癸巳年 (Water Snake); 2431 or 2224
- Coptic calendar: −551 – −550
- Discordian calendar: 899
- Ethiopian calendar: −275 – −274
- Hebrew calendar: 3493–3494
- Hindu calendars
- Vikram Samvat: −211 – −210
- Shaka Samvat: N/A
- Kali Yuga: 2833–2834
- Holocene calendar: 9733
- Iranian calendar: 889 BP – 888 BP
- Islamic calendar: 916 BH – 915 BH
- Javanese calendar: N/A
- Julian calendar: N/A
- Korean calendar: 2066
- Minguo calendar: 2179 before ROC 民前2179年
- Nanakshahi calendar: −1735
- Seleucid era: 44/45 AG
- Thai solar calendar: 275–276
- Tibetan calendar: ཆུ་ཕོ་འབྲུག་ལོ་ (male Water-Dragon) −141 or −522 or −1294 — to — ཆུ་མོ་སྦྲུལ་ལོ་ (female Water-Snake) −140 or −521 or −1293

Year 268 BC was a year of the pre-Julian Roman calendar. At the time it was known as the Year of the Consulship of Sophus and Russus (or, less frequently, year 486 Ab urbe condita). The denomination 268 BC for this year has been used since the early medieval period, when the Anno Domini calendar era became the prevalent method in Europe for naming years.

== Events ==
=== By place ===
==== Roman Republic ====
- The Romans found a colony at Malventum which they, for superstitious reasons, call Beneventum (since male means bad and bene means good in Latin).
- The Romans found a colony at Ariminum.

==== Greece ====
- Chremonides, an Athenian statesman and general, issues the Decree of Chremonides, creating an alliance between Sparta, Athens, and Ptolemy II of Egypt. The origins of this alliance lay in the continuing desire of many Greek states, notably Athens and Sparta, for a restoration of their former independence, along with the desire of Ptolemy II to create troubles for his rival Antigonus II, King of Macedonia. Ptolemy II's ambitions in the Aegean Sea are threatened by Antigonus Gonatas' fleet, so he carefully builds up a coalition of the rest of the Greeks against Macedonians. He especially cultivates Athens by supplying the city with grain.

==== India ====
- May 16 – Ashoka becomes emperor of the Maurya Empire.

== Births ==
- Fu Sheng (Master Fu), Chinese Confucian scholar (d. 178 BC)
- Li Yiji, Chinese politician and adviser (d. 204 BC)
