= Tlepolemus (regent of Egypt) =

Tlepolemus was regent of Egypt in the Ptolemaic period under the reign of the boy-king Ptolemy V. He was briefly prominent at the end of the 3rd century BC; his dates of birth and death are not known.

Tlepolemus was a member of a distinguished Persian family who had migrated to Egypt in the late 3rd century BC. He was strategos (military governor) of the region of Pelusium in 202 BC when the regent Agathocles and his family were overthrown and killed in a popular uprising. Tlepolemus took Agathocles' place as regent, but held it only until the following year, 201 BC, when he was in his turn replaced by Aristomenes of Alyzia.

== Sources ==
=== Primary sources ===
- Polybius, xv.25, 34

=== Secondary works ===
- Edwyn Bevan, The House of Ptolemy, Chapter 7, passim
- Walter Ameling, "Tlepolemos [4]" in Der neue Pauly vol. 12 part 1 p. 636 f.
