= Agathocles of Egypt =

Agathocles (Ancient Greek: Ἀγαθοκλῆς, flourished 3rd century BC, died 203/202 BC) was a Ptolemaic minister and together with his sister Agathoclea was very close to Egyptian king Ptolemy IV Philopator (r. 221–204 BC).

== Life ==
Agathocles through his father was a distant relation of the Ptolemaic dynasty. Agathocles was the son born to Oenanthe of Egypt from her first husband Agathocles and also had two unnamed sisters. His paternal grandmother Theoxena of Egypt, was a Syracusan princess and Theoxena's mother, also named Theoxena was a Macedonian noblewoman, who was the second older maternal half-sister of Ptolemy II Philadelphus (r. 283–246 BC). Polybius states he had other relations who served the Ptolemaic dynasty: Nico or Nicon, a nauarch under Ptolemy IV; Philo and Philammon, appointed Libyarch of Cyrene by himself.

Agathocles and his sister were introduced to Ptolemy IV by their ambitious mother. Despite Ptolemy IV marrying his sister Arsinoe III in 220 BC, Agathoclea continued to be his favourite. According to surviving inscriptions in 216/215 BC, Agathocles served as eponymous priest of the Ptolemaic cult of Alexander the Great. On the death of Ptolemy IV in 204 BC, Agathocles and his allies kept the event secret, that they might have an opportunity to plunder the royal treasury. They also formed a conspiracy with Sosibius aimed at placing Agathocles on the throne or at least making him regent for the new boy king, Ptolemy V Epiphanes. With the support of Sosibius, they murdered Arsinoe III. Agathocles then acted as guardian to the young king Ptolemy V Epiphanes.

Agathocles seems to have soon killed Sosibius, although the details of this event are unknown. In 203/202 BC, the Egyptians and the Greeks of Alexandria, exasperated at Agathocles' outrages, rose against him, and the military governor Tlepolemus placed himself at their head. They surrounded the palace in the night, and forced their way in. Agathocles and his sister begged for mercy, but in vain. Agathocles was killed by his friends, to avoid an even more cruel fate. Agathoclea with her sisters, and Oenanthe, who had taken refuge in a temple, were dragged out, and in a state of nakedness exposed to the fury of the multitude, who literally tore them limb from limb. All their relations and those who had had any share in the murder of Arsinoe III were likewise put to death. Agathocles died along with his wife and their son.

== Sources ==
=== Primary sources ===
- Polybius, xv.25, 34
- Porphyry on the Book of Daniel: section 45

=== Secondary sources ===
- Edwyn Bevan, The House of Ptolemy, Chapter 7, passim.
- Family of Agathocles
- Ptolemaic Genealogy: Agathoclea
