= Long Ju =

Chinese military general

- Born: Unknown
- Died: 204 BC; Weifang, Shandong
- Occupation: General

Long Ju (龍且; died 204 BC) was a Chinese military general who served under the warlord Xiang Yu during the Chu–Han Contention (206–202 BC), an interregnum between the Qin dynasty and Han dynasty.

== Life ==
Long Ju was a childhood friend of Xiang Yu; they were as close as brothers. When Xiang Yu's uncle Xiang Liang started a rebellion against the Qin dynasty in 208 BC, Long Ju accompanied the Xiangs on battles against Qin forces and became a trusted lieutenant of Xiang Yu.

Following the fall of the Qin dynasty in 206 BC, Xiang Yu, who had declared himself "Hegemon-King of Western Chu", appointed Long Ju as a general in his army. Long Ju fought for Xiang Yu during the Chu–Han Contention against Xiang Yu's rival, Liu Bang (King of Han. After Xiang Yu defeated Liu Bang at the Battle of Pengcheng in 205 BC, he put Long Ju in command of his elite cavalry forces composed of hired Xiongnu warriors.

In late 205 BC, after Ying Bu betrayed Xiang Yu and defected to Liu Bang's side, Xiang Yu sent Long Ju to attack Ying Bu. Long Ju defeated Ying Bu in Jiujiang and destroyed most of his forces; Ying Bu had no choice but to flee under his bodyguards' protection and take shelter under Liu Bang.

In 204 BC, Liu Bang sent his general Han Xin to lead a separate force to attack Qi. Sensing that Han Xin posed a threat on the northern front, Xiang Yu ordered Long Ju to lead reinforcements to help the Qi forces fend off Han Xin's attacks. The combined strength of the Chu and Qi forces, under Long Ju's command, was around 200,000 when they engaged Han Xin and his troops at the Battle of Wei River in present-day Weifang, Shandong. During the battle, Han Xin feigned defeat to put Long Ju off guard and lure him into a trap. When Long Ju led only dozens of his men in pursuit of Han Xin, the latter ordered his troops to open a dam and release the waters of the Wei River to flood the battlefield, separating Long Ju and his group from the rest of the Chu and Qi forces. Without their commander, the Chu and Qi forces were thrown into confusion and Long Ju found himself surrounded by Han Xin's forces. Despite fighting for his life, Long Ju was eventually overwhelmed and killed in battle.
