= Battle of Wei River =

204 BCE battle between the Han and a combined force of Qi and Western Chu

- Part of the Chu-Han contention
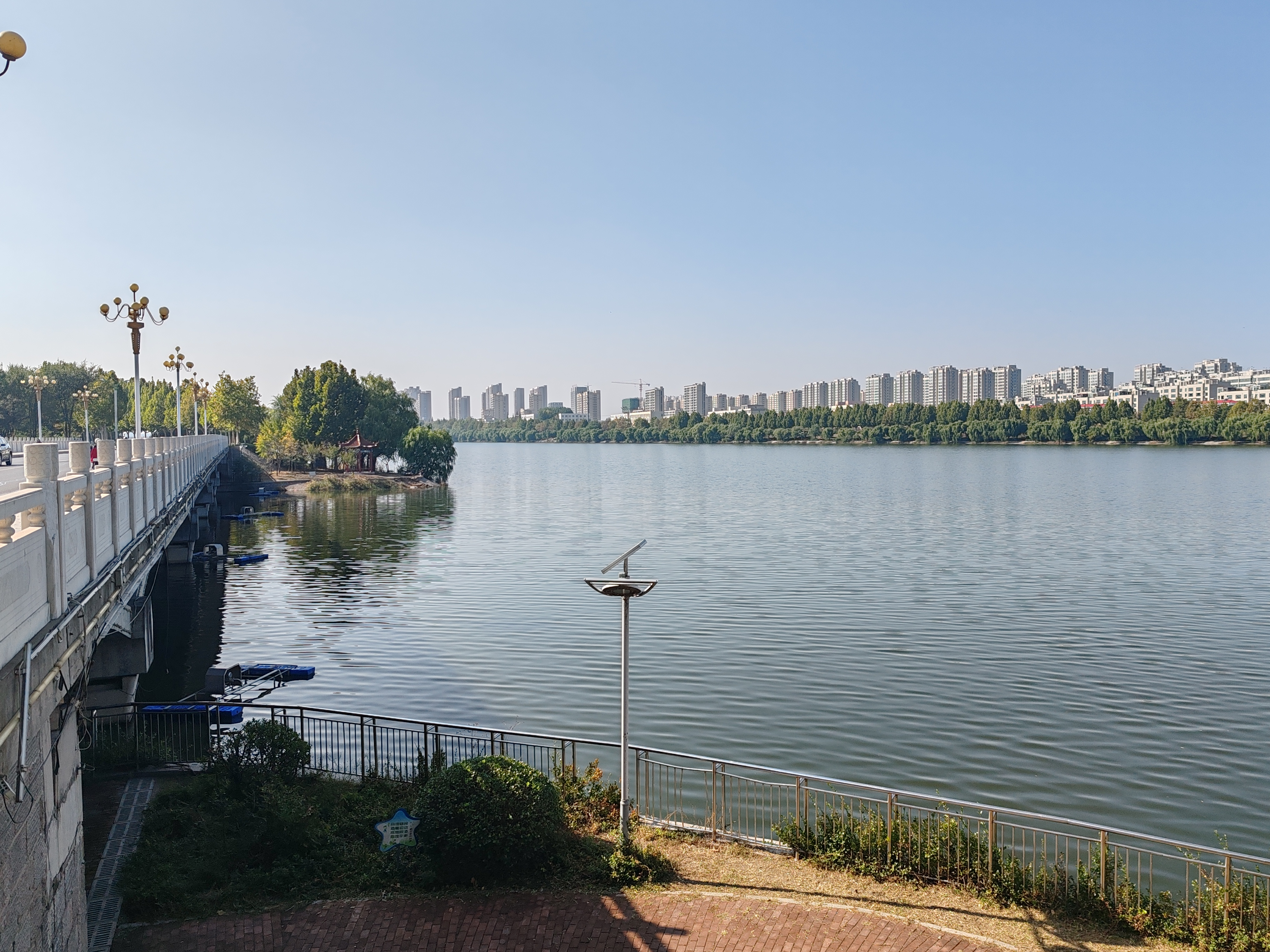
- Wei River in Zhucheng
Date	November 204 BC
Location	Wei River in Weifang, Shandong
Result	Han victory

Belligerents
Kingdom of Han	Western Chu; State of Qi

Commanders and leaders
Han Xin; Cao Can	Long Ju †; Tian Guang (POW)

Strength
Unknown Modern Estimates - 50,000–60,000 troops	200,000 Chu soldiers and an unknown number of Qi soldiers Modern Estimates - 80,000–120,000 troops

The Battle of Wei River (Chinese: 濰水之戰) was fought in November 204 BC between the Han and a combined force of Qi and Western Chu. The famous General Han Xin led the Han force, while the Chu were led by Long Ju and the Qi by King Tian Guang (田廣). The result ended with Han Xin conquering the Qi kingdom.

== Background ==
In 204 BC Han Xin completed the Han conquest of the State of Zhao. Liu Bang ordered many of Han Xin's troops and officers to return to the Central Plain to serve directly under Liu Bang, and he ordered Han Xin to raise a new army from the inhabitants of Zhao to attack the State of Qi. Qi was the last of the northern kingdoms not to have submitted to Liu Bang, and in 205 its formidable general Tian Heng, a member of the royal Tian clan, had previously forced Xiang Yu into a negotiated settlement, using fortresses and popular loyalty to the dynasty to wear down the armies of Chu.

Qi was of great use to the Han. Not only was it the richest and most populous of the northern kingdoms, with Xiang Yu making much use of it to feed his armies; it was also located directly to the north of Chu and would enable Han Xin to invade the Chu heartland to the east of the Central Plain, where Liu Bang and Xiang Yu were caught in a stalemate. Moreover, by conquering Qi, Han Xin would bring his northern strategy to completion. This strategy aimed to secure the manpower, food and wealth of northern China for Liu Bang while keeping Xiang Yu himself distracted in China's Central Plain. This was achieved by basing Liu Bang in the Central Plain in Xingyang and Chenggao, as the feud between Liu Bang and Xiang Yu, two former sworn brothers, was both political and personal.

== Han invasion ==
Han Xin finished raising and training his new army within only a few months, but Liu Bang also sent the noted diplomat Li Yiji to persuade the king of Qi, Tian Guang, to switch his allegiance to the Han faction. Liu Bang did so without informing Han Xin, but Han Xin learned through unofficial channels that Li Yiji was visiting Tian Guang and had persuaded the king to side with Liu Bang. Han Xin's advisor Kuai Che (蒯徹) convinced him to invade Qi anyway, since that was the order he had received from Liu Bang, and, so Kuai argued, it was unjust that Li Yiji should steal Han Xin's conquest from him with clever words.

In October Han Xin crossed into Qi, and surprised and defeated the Qi army at Lixia. Tian Guang believed that Li Yiji had deceived him and had him cooked alive. Meanwhile, Han Xin marched straight for Qi’s capital Linzi and took control of the city. Fleeing, Tian Guang called upon Xiang Yu for help. Xiang Yu realized the gravity of the situation, and he acted quicker to counter Han Xin than he ever had before. Previously Xiang Yu had sent forces to contest Han Xin's conquest of the State of Zhao, but this time he immediately sent his best general, Long Ju, with a very large army, to combine with the royal army of Qi.

== Battle ==
In November the Chu-Qi coalition camped on the south bank of the Wei River, opposite Han Xin’s army to the north. Upriver, Han Xin secretly constructed a makeshift dam with sandbags to lower the water level. Long Ju was counseled to fight a slow battle of attrition, since Han Xin was dangerous in battle and yet the inhabitants of Qi were hostile towards the Han army. A Chu officer suggested that they foster Qi rebellions against Han Xin by making them aware of their king Tian Guang's survival, and he noted that the Han army might have trouble feeding itself, being far from home. He also pointed out that the Qi soldiers might be more inclined to retreat, since their homes were nearby. However, Long Ju was determined to fight a decisive encounter.

One morning, Han Xin marched across the lowered river and attacked Long Ju's forces. Then, he made a feigned retreat, drawing Long Ju's forces across the river in pursuit. Long Ju led the vanguard in pursuit, but when only part of his army had made it across the river, Han Xin's soldiers released the dam. In this way, they isolated Long Ju and his vanguard, and Long was cut down in battle. Another Chu general, Zhou Lan, was captured, and the leaderless Chu army soon panicked and disintegrated. Having lost their allies, the Qi army fled and separated into smaller forces.

== Aftermath ==
Han Xin split up his army to complete the conquest of Qi, campaigning into the year 203. Han Xin pursued the king Tian Guang and captured him in Chengyang, but Tian Heng made himself the new king. Nevertheless, after capturing Qi’s Prime Minister Tian Guaang, Han Xin defeated a new counteroffensive by Tian Heng. Tian Heng subsequently fled the state for Liang, where he became a follower of the pro-Han warlord Peng Yue. Han Xin subsequently conquered the towns of Ying and Po and defeated and killed the Qi General-in-Chief Tian Xi near Qiansheng. Meanwhile, Han Xin's general Cao Shen attacked and killed Tian Ji in the Shandong Peninsula.

To challenge further attempts by the Tian clan at reviving their control over Qi, Han Xin requested that Liu Bang make him the Acting King of Qi, again acting on the advice of Kuai Tong. Liu Bang was angry that Han Xin was requesting a royal title while he himself was struggling against Xiang Yu in the Central Plain, but on the advice of Zhang Liang and Chen Ping, in February 203 he awarded Han Xin the full title of King while the latter was completing the conquest of Qi.

Because of the Han conquest of Qi, Xiang Yu's situation became increasingly precarious. Since 205, he and Liu Bang had worn each other down in a war of attrition in the Central Plain, and Xiang had effectively run out of options to wrest control of northern China from Han Xin. He sent an envoy to Han Xin with the proposal that he remain neutral and that China be divided between Liu Bang, Xiang Yu and Han Xin. Kuai Tong encouraged Han Xin to accept this proposal, accurately predicting that Liu Bang would eventually execute Han Xin as being too dangerous. However, Han Xin was grateful for the opportunities to command that he had received from Liu Bang, and he recalled that, when he had earlier served Xiang Yu as a guardsman, Xiang Yu had refused to listen to his suggestions. For these reasons, he chose to remain loyal to Liu Bang and soon coordinated the final campaign against Xiang Yu, which culminated in his victory in the Battle of Gaixia.

== See also ==
- Timeline of the Chu–Han Contention
