= Arsinoe III =

Queen of Egypt from 220 BC to 204 BC

Arsinoe III Thea Philopator
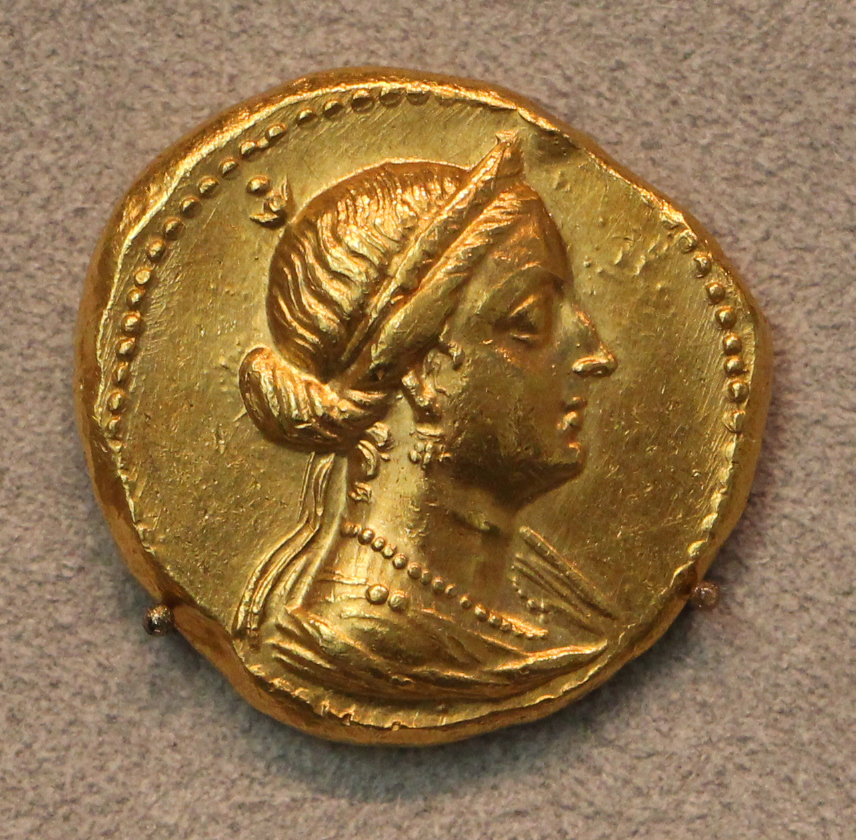
- Obverse of coin depicting Arsinoe III

Queen consort of Egypt (Note: Arsinoe III did have title of "female ruler" which could suggest she was Pharaoh alongside her husband, however she was not recognized as sovereign by the administration of the country.)
- Tenure: 220–204 BC
- Born: c. 246–245 BC
- Died: 204 BC
- Spouse: Ptolemy IV
- Issue: Ptolemy V Epiphanes
Names
- Arsinoe III Thea Philopator
- Dynasty: Ptolemaic
- Father: Ptolemy III
- Mother: Berenice II

Arsinoe III Philopator (Ancient Greek: Ἀρσινόη ἡ Φιλοπάτωρ, Arsinóē hē Philopátо̄r, meaning "Arsinoe the father-loving", 246 or 245 BC – 204 BC) was Queen of Ptolemaic Egypt in 220 – 204 BC. She was a daughter of Ptolemy III and Berenice II and spouse of her brother Ptolemy IV, possibly co-ruler. She was the first Ptolemaic queen to bear her brother's child.

== Life ==
Between late October and early November 220 BC, she was married to her younger brother, Ptolemy IV. She took an active part in the government of the country, at least in the measure that it was tolerated by the all-powerful minister Sosibius.

In 217 BC, she accompanied Ptolemy IV along with 55,000 troops at the Battle of Raphia in Palestine against Antiochus the Great with 68,000 troops. Arsinoe may have commanded a section of the infantry phalanx. Both sides employed cavalry, elephants, and specialized troops such as archers, as well as traditional Macedonian phalanx. When the battle went poorly, she appeared before the troops and exhorted them to fight to defend their families. She also promised two minas of gold to each of them if they won the battle, which they did.

In summer, 204 BC, Ptolemy IV died. His two leading favorites, Agathocles and Sosibius, fearing that Arsinoe would secure the regency, had her murdered by Philammon in a palace coup before she heard of her husband's death, thereby securing the regency for themselves.

== Issue ==
- Ptolemy V

== Legacy ==
Eratosthenes wrote a manuscript called the Arsinoe, which is lost, the subject being a memoir of the queen. It is quoted by many ancient scholars.

Portraits of her likeness are also rare, but do exist in the forms of a bust of marble, and another of bronze.
