= Sosibius =

Late 3rd-century BC Ptolemaic chief minister

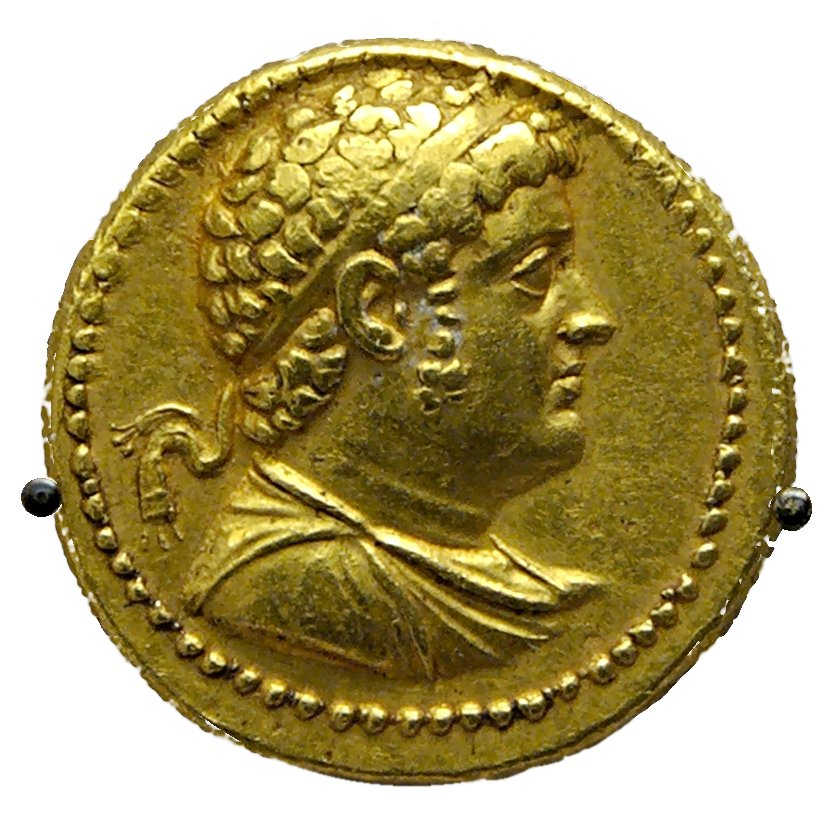
Gold octadrachm of Ptolemy IV Philopator (British Museum).

Sosibius (Ancient Greek: Σωσίβιoς; floruit 221-204 BC) was the chief minister of Ptolemy IV Philopator (221–204 BC), king of Egypt. Nothing is known of his origin or parentage, though he may have been a son of Sosibius of Tarentum; nor is there any account of how he rose to power. He is first attested immediately after the accession of Ptolemy IV in 221 BC, exercising great influence over the 22-year old king alongside Agathocles, the brother of Ptolemy IV's mistress Agathoclea. He remained a major force throughout the reign and helped ensure the smooth succession of Ptolemy V Epiphanes in 204 BC. After that he disappears from the record.

== Life ==
=== Accession of Ptolemy IV ===
The historian Polybius characterises him as "the pseudo-guardian of Ptolemy [who] seemed to be a shrewd and long-lasting tool, but was ever doing evil in the kingdom." and says he was responsible for a purge of the royal family which took place shortly after Ptolemy's accession. Ptolemy IV's uncle Lysimachus was probably murdered at this time. His mother Berenice II was believed to support his younger brother Magas, who had held substantial military commands and was popular with the army, so Magas was scalded to death in his bath. Berenice II died shortly afterwards; she is said to have been poisoned.

=== Fourth Syrian War ===
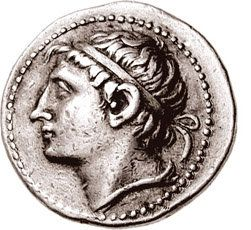
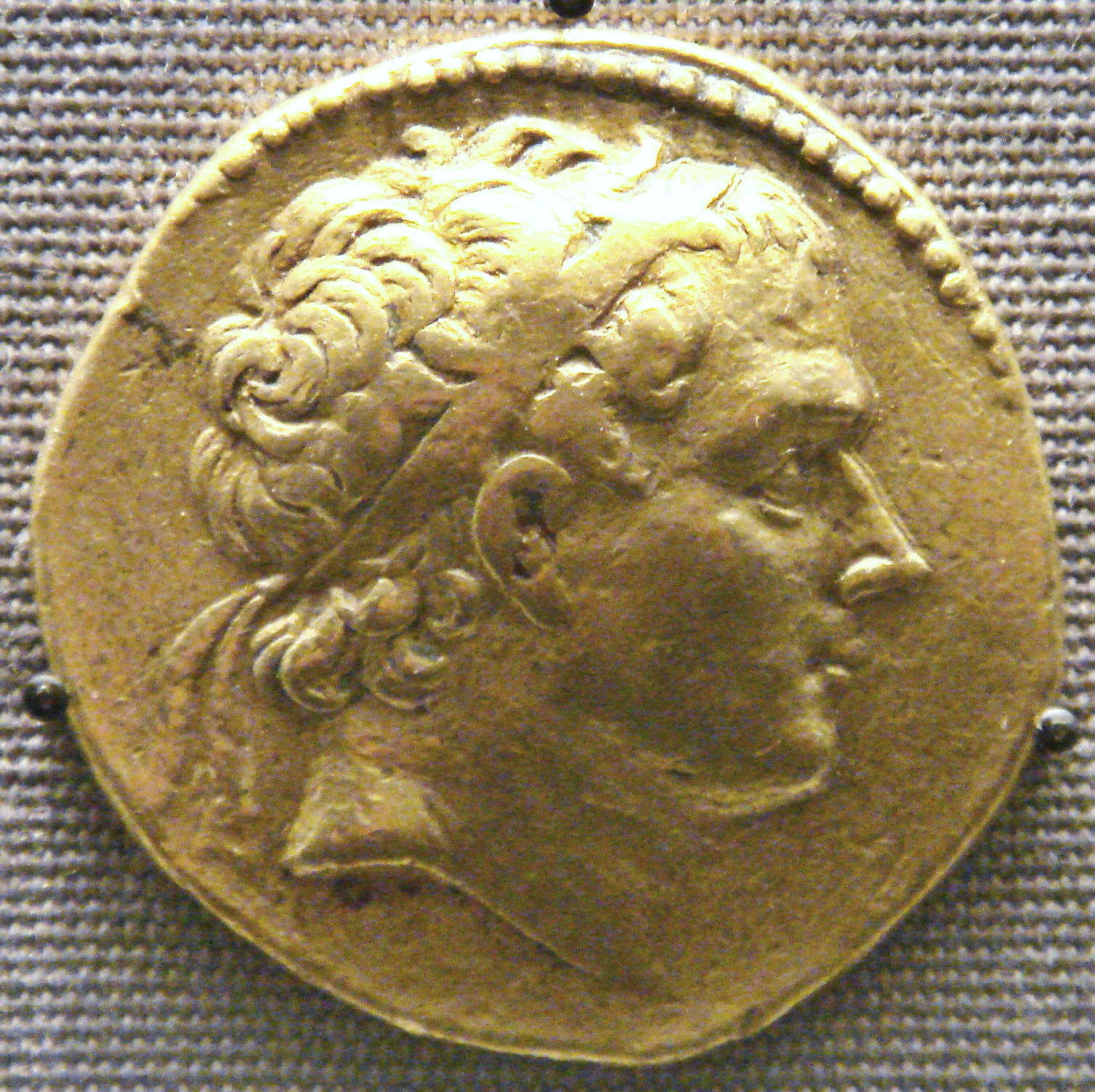
The Spartan king Cleomenes III (left) and the Seleucid king Antiochus III (right)

The Seleucid king Antiochus the Great invaded Coele-Syria in 221 BC. He was rebuffed by the Ptolemaic governor of the region, Theodotus, and forced to turn east as a result of the revolt of his satrap of Media, Molon, but in spring 219 BC he attacked once more, beginning the Fourth Syrian War and quickly captured most of Coele-Syria. Polybius says that this occurred because Ptolemy had given himself up to luxury, leaving all administration of the kingdom to Sosibius, who neglected the finances and military defences.

In the midst of this, there was a revolt in Alexandria, led by Cleomenes III of Sparta, which Polybius presents as having been a serious threat to Ptolemy IV's regime. Ptolemy III had promised to restore Cleomenes III, now living in Alexandria with a force of 3,000 mercenaries, to the Spartan throne, but his death had put an end to these plans. Initially, Ptolemy IV and Sosibius had indulged Cleomenes III, seeing him as a counter to Ptolemy IV's brother Magas. But after Magas' death, Ptolemy IV's interest waned and Sosibius had had the Spartan placed under house arrest. In 219 BC, while Ptolemy IV was at Canopus, Cleomenes III broke free and attempted to lead an armed uprising against Sosibius. He and his followers launched an attack on the main citadel in Alexandria, hoping to liberate the men imprisoned within, but this attack was unsuccessful and the people of Alexandria did not respond to their call to rise up. Cleomenes III and his followers then committed suicide.

At the beginning of winter, Antiochus III negotiated a ceasefire with Ptolemy IV. Formal peace negotiations followed at Seleucia Pieria, but they do not seem to have been undertaken in good faith on either side. Sosibius and Agathocles used the cease fire to whip the Ptolemaic army into shape, while Antiochus III used it to prepare for a new offensive. In early 218 BC, the Seleucid king obliterated the Ptolemaic forces at Berytus on land and at sea, opening the way for the invasion of Coele Syria. There he captured Philadelphia, but was unable to gain the southern Beqa'a valley, Damascus, or Sidon. In 217 BC, Sosibius accompanied Ptolemy IV and Arsinoe III when they led the Egyptian army into the Levant. The Ptolemaic army defeated Antiochus decisively in battle at Raphia on 22 June 217 BC and Ptolemy sent Sosibius to organise the peace treaty that ended the war. Ptolemy IV retained the territories that he had held at the start of the war except, apparently, Seleucia Pieria, and he received an enormous sum of gold.

=== Accession of Ptolemy V ===
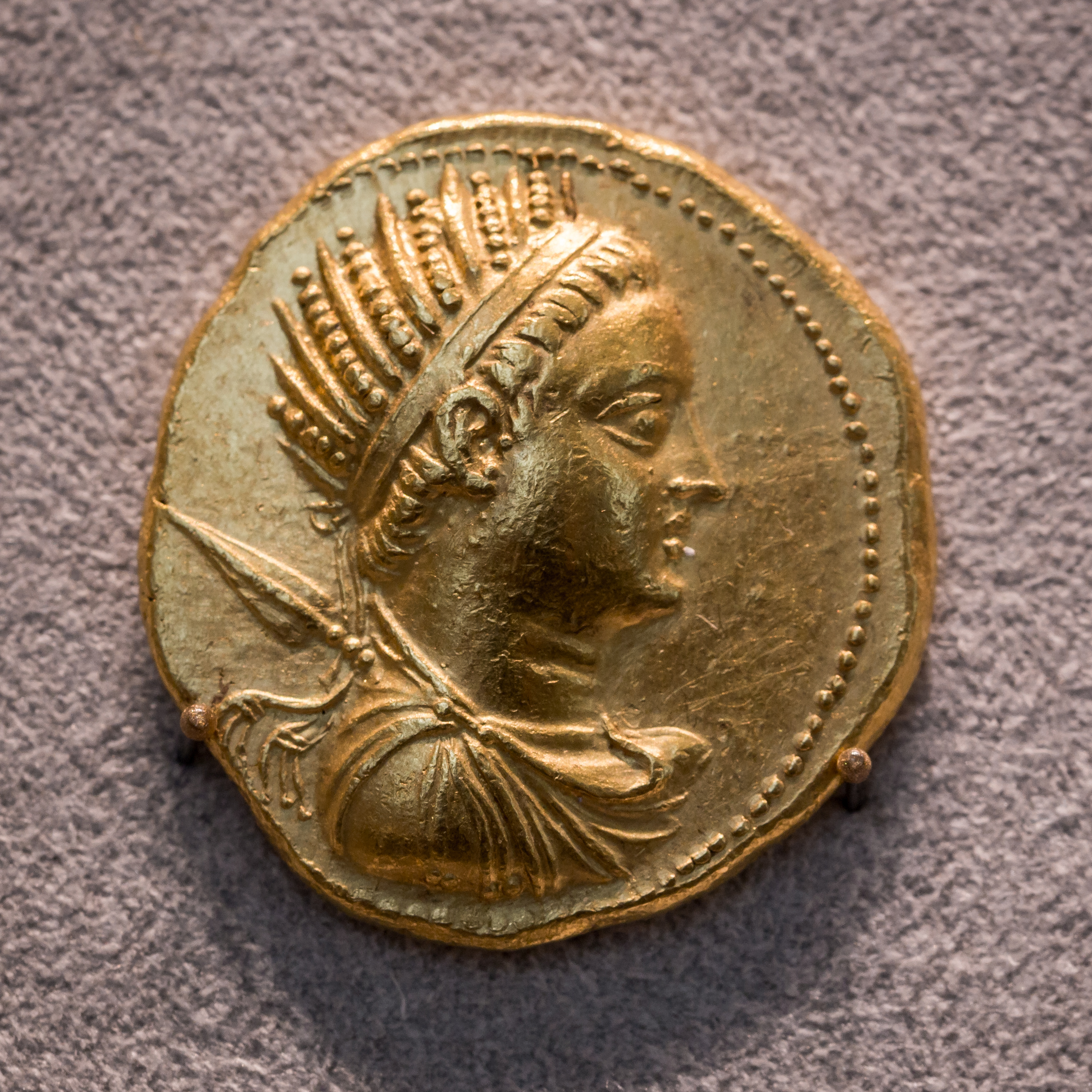
Tetradrachm of Ptolemy V Epiphanes, issued c. 200 BC.

Sosibius seems to have remained in power for the rest of Ptolemy IV's reign alongside Agathocles. Revolts broke out in Egypt sometime before 207 BC. In October or November 205 BC, the leader of the southern revolt captured the city of Thebes and had himself crowned Pharaoh, taking the name Horwennefer, rendered in Greek sources as Hugronaphor. In the midst of this conflict, in July or August 204 BC, Ptolemy IV died in unclear circumstances. A late source, John of Antioch mentions a fire in the palace. Arsinoe III also died at this time. According to Polybius, she was murdered by Sosibius, but another historian, Justin, says that she had been divorced and murdered by Ptolemy IV under the influence of his mistress Agathoclea, shortly before his own death.

An uncertain amount of time elapsed after the death of Ptolemy IV and Arsinoe III (perhaps a week) during which Sosibius and Agathocles kept their deaths secret. The only living member of the royal family was Ptolemy IV's son Ptolemy V Epiphanes, who was about five years old. Some time before September 204 BC, the royal bodyguard and army officers were gathered at the royal palace and Sosibius announced the death of the ruling couple and presented Ptolemy IV's son Ptolemy V Epiphanes to be acclaimed as king, wrapping the diadem around his head. Sosibius read out Ptolemy IV's will, which made Sosibius and Agathocles regents and placed Ptolemy V in the personal care of his mistress Agathoclea and her mother Oenanthe. Polybius thought that this will was a forgery produced by Sosibius and Agathocles themselves and modern scholars tend to agree with him. Sosibius is not heard of again after this event and it is generally assumed that he died, perhaps at the hands of Agathocles. Hölbl suggests that the loss of his acumen was fatal to the regency.

== Bibliography ==
- Polybius; Histories, Evelyn S. Shuckburgh (translator); London - New York, (1889)
- Bevan, Edwyn R.; The House of Ptolemy, London, (1927), chapter 7
- Hölbl, Günther (2001). A History of the Ptolemaic Empire. London & New York: Routledge. pp. 143–152 & 181–194. ISBN 0415201454.
- Smith, William (editor); Dictionary of Greek and Roman Biography and Mythology, "Sosibius (2)", Boston, (1867)
