= Ptolemy IV Philopator =

4th Pharaoh of Ptolemaic Egypt (r. 221–204 BC)

- Ancient Greek: Πτολεμαῖος Φιλοπάτωρ; Ancient Egyptian: Iwaennetjerwymenkhwy Setepptah Userkare Sekhemankhamun
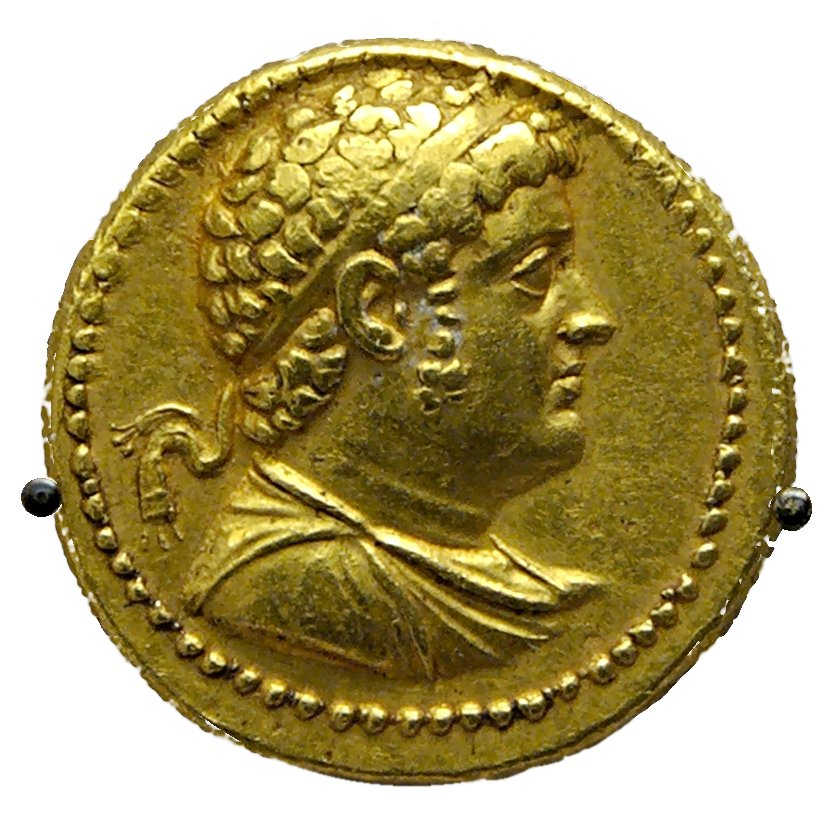
- Gold octadrachm in the British Museum

Pharaoh and King of the Ptolemaic Kingdom
- Reign: 221 – 204 BC
- Predecessor: Ptolemy III
- Successor: Ptolemy V
Royal titulary
Horus name
ḥnw-ḳni sḫꜤi.n-sw-it.f
Khunuqeni sekhaensuitef
The strong youth whose father has allowed him to appear
G5	H wn nw W A17 q nw Z9 D40 s xa a n z t f p f
G5	H wn nw W A17 q nw Z9 D40 s xa a n sw w t f Z1 f
G5	H wn n nw W A17 q nw D40 s xa a n z t f Z1 f
Nebty name
wr-pḥtj mnḫ-jb-ḫr-nṯrw-nbw nḏtj-n-ḥnmmt
Werpekhty menekhibkhernetjerunebu nedjtyenkhenmemet
Whose might is great, whose heart is beneficial with all the Gods, who is the savior of mankind
G16	wr r F9 F9 mnx D2 x r nTr Z2 nb Aa27 t y A40 n N8 A1 Z2
Golden Horus
swḏꜢ-bꜢḳt sḥḏ-gsw-prw smn-hpw-mi ḏḥwti-ꜤꜢ-ꜤꜢ nb-ḥbw-sd-mi-ptḥ-tꜢ-ṯnn ity-mi-rꜤ
Sewedjabaqet sekhedjgesuperu semenhepumi Djehutia'a nebkhabusedmiptah-tatjenen itymire
Who has kept Baqet safe by illuminating the temples and establishing laws
like the twice-great Thoth, possessor of Sed festivals like Ptah Tatenen and a sovereign like Ra
G8	z U29 D10 t O49 z ra T5 H6 O1 H6 O1 H6 O1 z U32 h p H6 Z3 H6 G26 M30 M30 mi nb O23 Z3 p t H C18 U7 A31 N6 Z1 m
Prenomen
jwꜤ-n-nṯrwj-mnḫwj stp.n-ptḥ wsr-kꜢ-rꜤ sḫm-Ꜥnḫ-n-jmn
Iwaennetjerwymenekhwy Setepenptah Userkare Sekhemankhamun
The heir of the two potent gods, chosen by Ptah,
the strong one of the ka of Ra, the living image of Amun

M23 X1 L2 X1	mnx nTr mnx nTr F44 n p t H stp n N kA wsr C12 C2 sxm anx

M23 X1 L2 X1	mnx nTr mnx nTr F44 n p t H stp n wsr kA C2 C12 sxm anx
Nomen
ptwlmjs Ꜥnḫ-ḏt mrj-Ꜣst
Ptolemys ankhdjet meryaset
Ptolemaios, living forever, beloved of Isis

G39 N5	p t wA l M i i s anx D&t&N17 st t mr
- Consorts: Arsinoe III, Agathoclea
- Children: Ptolemy V
- Father: Ptolemy III
- Mother: Berenice II
- Born: May or June 244 BC
- Died: July or August 204 BC (aged 40)
- Dynasty: Ptolemaic dynasty

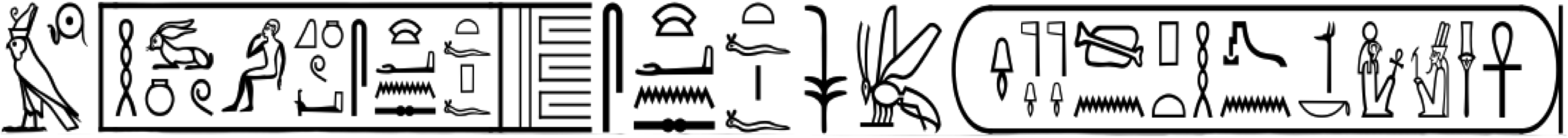
Ptolemy IV Philopator (Note: Numbering the Ptolemies is a modern convention. Older sources may give a number one higher or lower. The most reliable way of determining which Ptolemy is being referred to in any given case is by epithet (e.g. "Philopator").) (Greek: Πτολεμαῖος Φιλοπάτωρ, romanized: Ptolemaĩos Philopátōr; "Ptolemy, lover of his Father"; May/June 244 – July/August 204 BC) was the fourth pharaoh of Ptolemaic Egypt from 221 to 204 BC. (Note: King's title "The strong youth whose father has allowed him to appear, the heir of the two potent gods, chosen by Ptah, the strong one of the Ka of Ra, the living image of Amun")

Ptolemy IV was the son of Ptolemy III and Berenice II. His succession to the throne was accompanied by a wide-ranging purge of the Ptolemaic royal family, which left control of the realm's government largely in the hands of his courtiers Sosibius and Agathocles. His reign was marked by the Fourth Syrian War (219–217 BC) with the Seleucid empire, which culminated in a decisive Ptolemaic victory at the Battle of Raphia, one of the largest battles of the whole Hellenistic Age. In the final years of his rule, control over the southern portion of the country was lost to the rebel pharaoh Hugronaphor. Ptolemy IV died in mysterious circumstances in 204 BC and was succeeded by his young son Ptolemy V Epiphanes under the regency of Sosibius and Agathocles.

In ancient sources, Ptolemy IV was criticised for being more interested in luxury and court ceremony than government, politics, and foreign relations. The decline of the Ptolemaic dynasty is usually traced to his reign.

== Background and early life ==
Ptolemy IV was the second child and eldest son of Ptolemy III and his wife Berenice II. He was born about two years after his father's accession to the throne of Egypt. Ptolemy IV had an older sister, Arsinoe III, and three younger brothers, Lysimachus (name uncertain), Alexander and Magas, all born in the 240s BC. The whole family is commemorated by a statuary groups set up at Thermos and Delphi by the Aetolian League. Under Ptolemy III, the Ptolemaic kingdom had reached its height, decisively defeating the rival Seleucid kingdom in the Third Syrian War (246–241 BC), financing mainland Greek opposition to Antigonid Macedonia, and maintaining control of nearly the entire eastern Mediterranean seaboard. However the reign was also marked by the first native Egyptian revolt against Ptolemaic rule, in 245 BC. In the final years of Ptolemy III's reign, the Cleomenean War (229–222 BC) broke out in Greece and, despite receiving substantial Ptolemaic support, Cleomenes III of Sparta had been completely defeated by an Antigonid-led coalition and forced to flee to Egypt.

== Reign ==
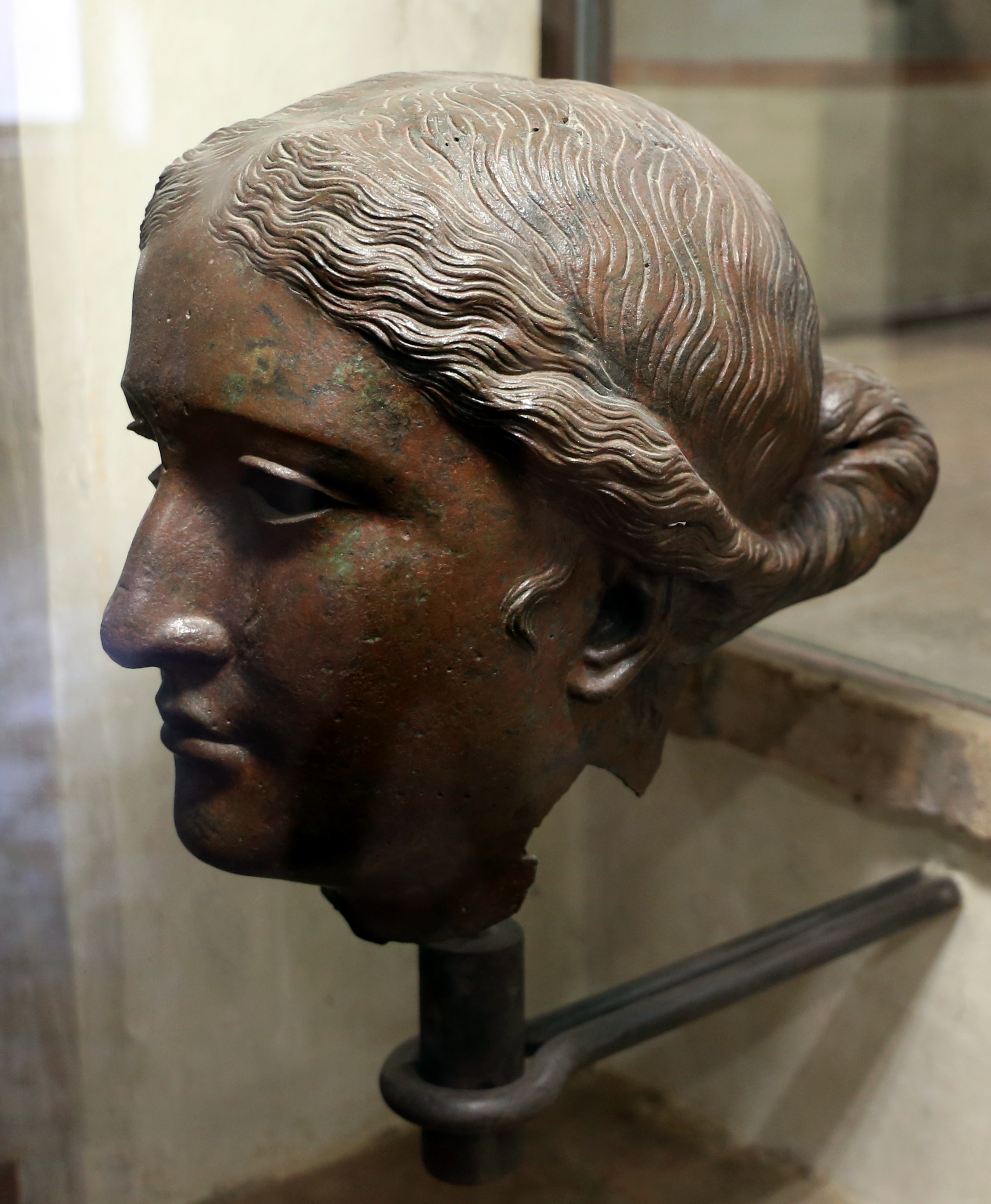
Bronze bust of the 1st century BC, possibly depicting Queen Arsinoe III

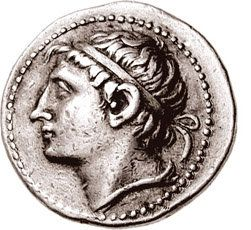
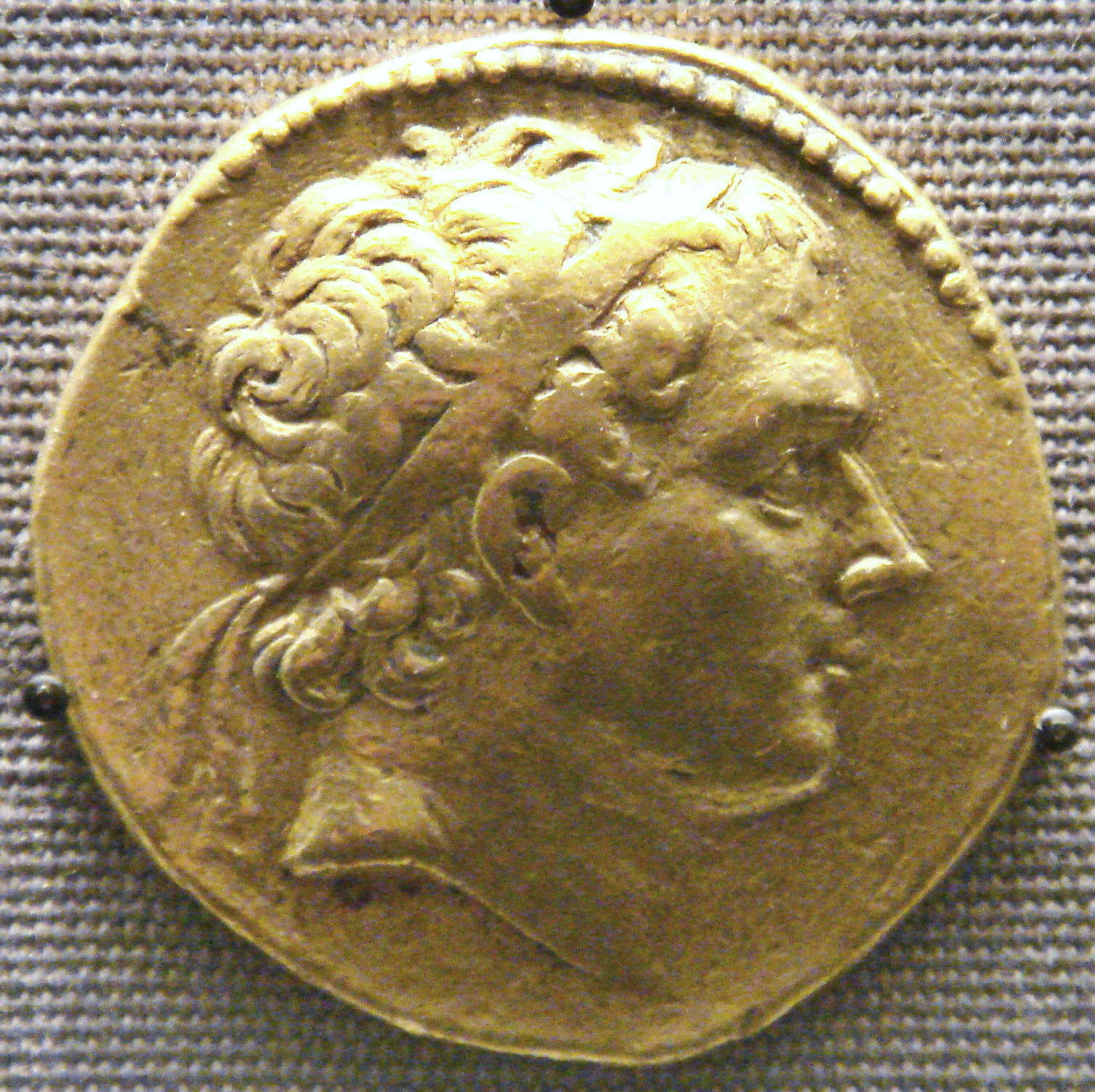
Two rivals of Ptolemy IV, the Spartan king Cleomenes III (left) and the Seleucid king Antiochus III (right)

Sometime between October and December 222 BC, Ptolemy III died and Ptolemy IV was crowned king. The new king was about twenty years old and was under the strong influence of two prominent aristocrats: Sosibius and Agathocles, the brother of Ptolemy IV's mistress Agathoclea. On Ptolemy IV's accession, Sosibius engineered a large-scale purge of the royal family in order to eliminate anyone who might be able to oppose him. Ptolemy IV's uncle Lysimachus was probably murdered at this time. His mother Berenice II was believed to support his younger brother Magas, who had held substantial military commands and was popular with the army, so Magas was scalded to death in his bath. Berenice II died shortly afterwards; she is said to have been poisoned. By contrast, Ptolemy IV's older sister, Arsinoe III, was brought into close association with the king. They had married by 220 BC; sibling marriage was a common practice among Egyptian royal families, including the Ptolemies.

=== Fourth Syrian War (219–217 BC) ===
In 222 BC, Antiochus III had assumed the Seleucid throne and he instantly proved a dynamic leader, determined to restore Seleucid power and to reverse the losses that the Seleucids had suffered in the Third Syrian War. In 221 BC, one year after his accession, Antiochus III invaded the Ptolemaic territories in Coele-Syria. He was rebuffed by the Ptolemaic governor of the region, Theodotus, and forced to turn east as a result of the revolt of his satrap of Media, Molon.

In spring 219 BC, Antiochus III tried again, attacking and capturing the key port city and 'hearth of the Seleucid dynasty' Seleucia Pieria, which had been under Ptolemaic control since 246 BC. Immediately after this, Theodotus, who had become unpopular at the Ptolemaic court, switched to the Seleucid side, bringing Coele Syria and a large portion of the Ptolemaic fleet with him. Antiochus III received the surrender of Tyre and Ptolemais Ake, but he became bogged down in protracted sieges of Sidon and Dora.

In the midst of this, there was a revolt in Alexandria, led by Cleomenes III of Sparta, which Polybius presents as having been a serious threat to Ptolemy IV's regime. Ptolemy III had promised to restore Cleomenes III, now living in Alexandria with a force of 3,000 mercenaries, to the Spartan throne, but his death had put an end to these plans. Initially, Ptolemy IV and Sosibius had indulged Cleomenes III, seeing him as a counter to Ptolemy IV's brother Magas. But after Magas's death, Ptolemy IV's interest waned and Sosibius had had the Spartan placed under house arrest. In 219 BC, while Ptolemy IV was at Canopus, Cleomenes III broke free and attempted to lead an armed uprising against Sosibius. He and his followers launched an attack on the main citadel in Alexandria, hoping to liberate the men imprisoned within, but this attack was unsuccessful and the people of Alexandria did not respond to their call to rise up. Cleomenes III and his followers then committed suicide.

The Mediterranean in 218 BC

Antiochus III's efforts to consolidate his control over Coele Syria lasted for the rest of 219 BC. At the beginning of winter, he had to negotiate a ceasefire with Ptolemy IV. Formal peace negotiations followed at Seleucia Pieria, but they do not seem to have been undertaken in good faith on either side. Antiochus refused to consider returning Seleucia Pieria to the Ptolemies, while Ptolemy IV demanded that Antiochus III recognise Achaeus, the de facto ruler of Asia Minor, who was considered a rebel by the Seleucid court, as a party to the piece.

Sosibius and Agathocles used the cease fire to whip the Ptolemaic army into shape, while Antiochus III used it to prepare for a new offensive. In early 218 BC, the Seleucid king obliterated the Ptolemaic forces at Berytus on land and at sea, opening the way for the invasion of Coele Syria. There he captured Philadelphia, but was unable to gain the southern Beqa'a valley, Damascus, or Sidon.

In 217 BC, Ptolemy IV and Arsinoe III led the Egyptian army into the Levant, where it met Antiochus III's army in battle at Raphia on 22 June 217 BC. This was one of the largest battles of the Hellenistic Age with over 150,000 soldiers participating in the melee. At the start of the battle, the Ptolemaic elephant forces were routed and Antiochus followed that up by charging in on horseback and breaking the Ptolemaic left wing. Polybius (generally hostile to Ptolemy IV) represents Ptolemy IV's sudden appearance on the front lines as the decisive turning point in the battle, inspiring his troops to fight on and defeat the rest of the Seleucid army which turned and fled while Antiochus III was still chasing the fleeing Ptolemaic soldiers on the left wing. When he discovered what had happened, Antiochus III had no choice but to retreat to Antioch.

After the battle, Ptolemy IV set to work reorganising the situation in Coele Syria and sent Sosibius to negotiate with Antiochus III. At the end of summer, he invaded Seleucid Syria, forcing Antiochus III to accept a peace treaty. Ptolemy IV retained the territories that he had held at the start of the war except, apparently, Seleucia Pieria, and he received an enormous sum of gold. By 12 October, Ptolemy IV had returned to Egypt, where the victory was celebrated by a priestly synod at Memphis which issued the Raphia decree. The relatively mild terms of the peace and Ptolemy IV's failure to capitalise on his victory by going on the offensive have caused some surprise among modern scholars; the Raphia decree refers rather unclearly to "the treachery which the commanders of the troops perpetrated" which may be relevant to Ptolemy's decision to make peace.

=== Foreign affairs in the later reign (217–205 BC) ===
After the Fourth Syrian War, Antiochus III quickly recovered his strength and led successful expeditions against other enemies. Probably as a result, Ptolemy IV's interactions with other states all focused on maintaining peaceful relations and preventing warfare.

In mainland Greece, Ptolemy IV attempted to rebuild the Ptolemaic influence that had suffered a serious setback under Ptolemy III as a result of the Cleomenean War. In 217 BC, Ptolemy's diplomats helped to broker the Peace of Naupactus which brought an end to the Social War between Antigonid Macedonia and the Aetolian League. He had much less success in his attempts to negotiate a peace between the Macedonia and the Roman Republic in the First Macedonian War (215–205 BC). Ptolemy IV made large financial contributions to a number of Greek cities in order to gain their favour. He was responsible for the city walls at Gortyn in Crete Ptolemy was honoured for his benefactions with monuments and cults in his honour at various cities, including Rhodes and Oropus

In the west, Ptolemy maintained friendly neutrality with the Roman Republic and Carthage, which were fighting against one another in the Second Punic War (218-201 BC). He received a friendly embassy from the Romans in 210 BC, requesting a gift of grain to help feed the starving populace. It is unknown how Ptolemy responded to this request. Like his predecessors, Ptolemy IV maintained particularly close relations with the kingdom of Syracuse under King Hiero II, but the accession of Hiero II's grandson Hieronymus in 215 BC threatened to upset the careful balance that Ptolemy IV had maintained. Hieronymus repeatedly tried to bring the Ptolemies into the Second Punic War on the Carthaginian side. The situation was resolved with his assassination in 214 BC.

=== Egyptian Revolt and death (206–204 BC) ===
Sometime after the end of the Fourth Syrian War, the Great Theban Revolt broke out in Egypt itself. Fighting took place in the north of the country in the Delta and separately in Upper Egypt, where fighting led to the interruption of building work on the Temple of Horus at Edfu in 207–206 BC. The reasons for these revolts are unclear. The Hellenistic historian Polybius argued that they were a natural result of Ptolemy IV's decision to arm the Egyptians during the Fourth Syrian War. Günther Hölbl argues that the fact that the rebels attacked Egyptian temples suggests that it was "a rebellion of the lower classes inspired by social injustice," that had been exacerbated by the heavy taxation necessary to fund that war. In October or November 205 BC, the leader of the southern revolt captured the city of Thebes and had himself crowned Pharaoh, taking the name Horwennefer, rendered in Greek sources as Hugronaphor. Despite Ptolemaic efforts to suppress his regime, Horwennefer would retain his independence for nearly twenty years, until finally captured in August 186 BC.

The revolt meant that Ptolemaic forces were unable to defend southern Egypt from Nubian incursions. Probably in 207–06 BC, King Arqamani of Meroe seized control of the Dodecaschoenus. A number of the temple building projects that had been undertaken in this region were completed by Arqameni or his successor Adikhalamani. In many cases, the work of Ptolemy IV was simply appropriated by erasing his name from inscriptions and replacing it with that of Arqameni.

In the midst of this conflict, in July or August 204 BC, Ptolemy IV died in unclear circumstances. A late source, John of Antioch mentions a fire in the palace. Arsinoe III also died at this time. According to Justin, she had been divorced and murdered by Ptolemy IV under the influence of his mistress Agathoclea, shortly before his own death. According to Polybius, she was murdered by Sosibius. After a few days during which Ptolemy IV's death was kept secret, his six-year-old son Ptolemy V, who had been co-regent since 210 BC, was formally proclaimed king with Sosibius and Agathoclea's brother Agathocles as his regents.

== Regime ==
=== Ptolemaic dynastic cult ===
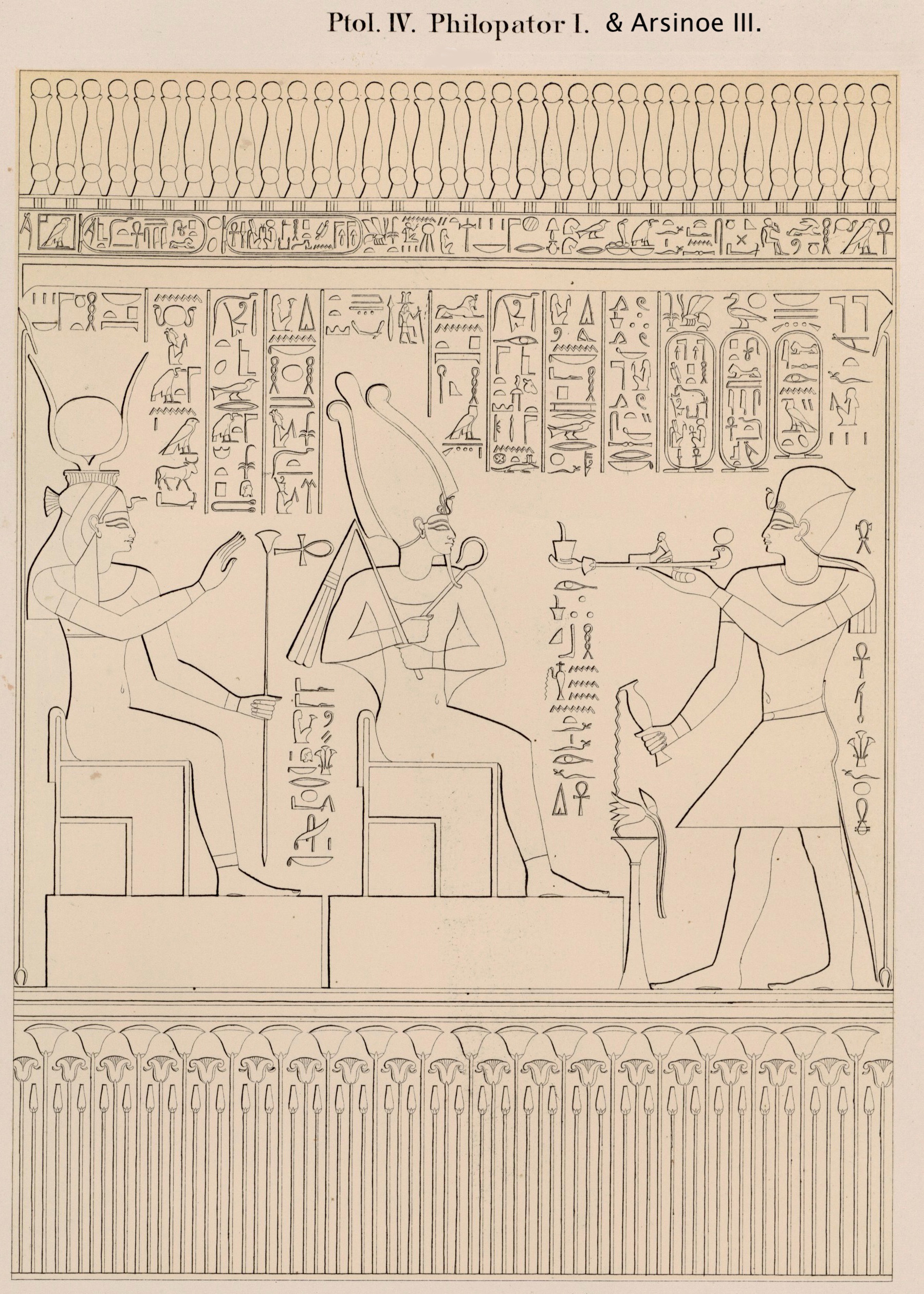
Ptolemy IV and wife Arsinoe III; relief in the Temple of Hathor at Deir el-Medina

Like early Ptolemaic monarchs, Ptolemy IV was proclaimed to be a deity on his accession to the throne, as the Theos Philopator (Father-loving God). Particularly after the Fourth Syrian War, he systematised the dynastic cult, reinforcing the links between the worship of the reigning king and the cults of Alexander the Great and Dionysus.

In 216–215 BC, after the victory celebrations for the Fourth Syrian War, Ptolemy IV and his wife as the Theoi Philopatores (Father-loving gods) were formally incorporated into the dynastic cult. This meant that they were added to the title of the Priest of Alexander the Great in Alexandria, who led the Ptolemaia festival and whose name and titulary was used to name the year in all official and private documents. This followed the pattern that had been laid down by Ptolemy IV's predecessors, particularly Ptolemy III, whose incorporation into the dynastic cult seems to have formed part of the victory celebrations for the Third Syrian War.

In order to assert the unity of this dynastic cult, Ptolemy IV had the existing tomb of Alexander the Great and the tombs of the individual Ptolemaic kings in Alexandria demolished. A new, pyramidal structure was built within the palace district of Alexandria to house the bodies of Alexander and the Ptolemies together. This structure seems to have been consecrated at the Ptolemaia festival of 215–214 BC. At the same time, Ptolemy IV incorporated the cult of the dynastic founders Ptolemy I and Berenice I as the Theoi Soteres (Saviour gods) into the main dynastic cult overseen by the priest of Alexandria. Probably also in 215–214 BC, he instituted a new cult in the Greek city of Ptolemais in southern Egypt, dedicated to Ptolemy I and the reigning monarch.

In 211 BC, Ptolemy IV seems to have begun propagating another cult for his deceased mother Berenice II, on the model of the earlier cult for Ptolemy IV's grandmother, Arsinoe II. A temple for Berenice sozousa (Berenice who saves) was established in Alexandria, by the shore, and seems to have been associated with protection of sailors, closely paralleling the cult of Arsinoe II. Berenice also received a special priestess, the athlophorus (prize-bearer), who marched in the Ptolemaia procession and appeared in official records of the date ahead of the canephorus (basket-bearer) of Arsinoe II. Similar priestesses would be established for later queens in the following reigns.

Ptolemy IV also strongly emphasised the cult of Dionysus and linked the god closely to the dynastic cult. Dionysus was the Greek god of wine and was closely associated with the royal ideal of opulence and luxury, known in Greek as tryphe, which Ptolemy IV wished to cultivate. Several new festivals of Dionysus were inaugurated, in which Ptolemy IV himself led the processions, beating on a tympanon. He renamed several areas of Alexandria in honour of Dionysus and his attributes. Sometime before 217 BC, Ptolemy IV ordered all priests of Dionysus to come to Alexandria to be registered and to submit their holy books and mystery rites to government inspection. This demonstrates a desire to assert his total control of Dionysus worship within his realm. Ptolemy IV himself was referred to as the Neos Dionysos (New Dionysus) and depicted with attributes of the god in images. Equations with other deities were also made in royal imagery: one notable set of gold octodrachms depicts the king with the rayed crown of Apollo or Helios, the trident of Poseidon, and the aegis of Athena, Zeus, and Alexander.

Many Greek cities that were under Ptolemy IV's control or aligned with him also established official cults in his honour during his reign. Greek cities in this period regularly granted such cults to monarchs and other powerful individuals, usually in thanks for a specific benefaction. Notable examples are found in Jaffa and other cities of the Levant after the victory at Raphia, where Ptolemy even bears the title Great king.

=== Pharaonic ideology and Egyptian religion ===
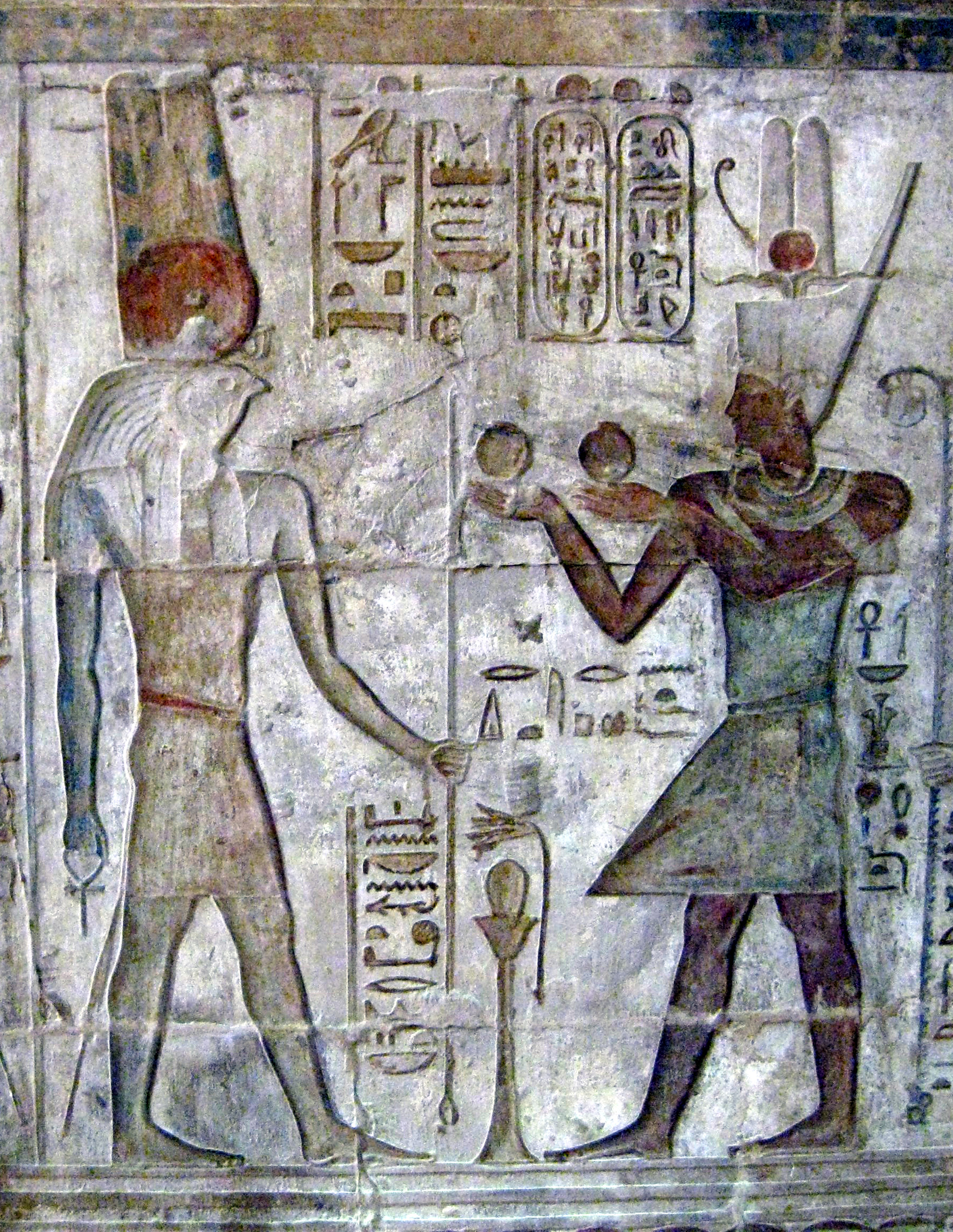
Relief depicting Ptolemy IV making an offering to Montu at Deir el-Medina

Sites of construction work under Ptolemy IV

Like his predecessors, Ptolemy IV presented himself as a typical Egyptian pharaoh and actively supported the Egyptian priestly elite through donations and temple construction. Ptolemy III had introduced an important innovation in 238 BC by holding a synod of all the priests of Egypt at Canopus. Ptolemy IV continued this tradition by holding his own synod at Memphis in 217 BC, after the victory celebrations of the Fourth Syrian War. The result of this synod was the Raphia Decree, issued on 15 November 217 BC and preserved in three copies. Like other Ptolemaic decrees, the decree was inscribed in hieroglyphs, Demotic, and Koine Greek. The decree records the military success of Ptolemy IV and Arsinoe III and their benefactions to the Egyptian priestly elite. Throughout, Ptolemy IV is presented as taking on the role of Horus who avenges his father by defeating the forces of disorder led by the god Set. In return, the priests undertook to erect a statue group in each of their temples, depicting the god of the temple presenting a sword of victory to Ptolemy IV and Arsinoe III. A five-day festival was inaugurated in honour of the Theoi Philopatores and their victory. The decree thus seems to represent a successful marriage of Egyptian pharaonic ideology and religion with the Hellenistic Greek ideology of the victorious king and his ruler cult.

Ptolemy IV also maintained a close and friendly relationship with the priestly elite by supporting and funding construction work at sanctuaries throughout Egypt, mostly continuing projects begun earlier in the dynasty. The most notable example of this is the Temple of Horus at Edfu, where construction had begun in 237 BC under Ptolemy III, but carried on through most of Ptolemy IV's reign until Hugronaphor's revolt forced the end of works in 207–206 BC. By that time most of the structure had been built and most of the interior decoration had been carved. These inscriptions present Ptolemy IV as an ideal pharaoh, emphasising his military victories in Syria and his pious attitude towards the gods. Annual coronation rituals took place in the sanctuary, in which the god Horus symbolically received kingship from Ra and Osiris and the reigning Pharaoh received his kingship from Ra and Horus. Ptolemy IV never participated in this ritual personally; his role was played by a priest. Support for the sanctuary thus represented the Ptolemaic commitment to a traditional Egyptian theology of kingship.

Other construction work carried out under Ptolemy IV's auspices included (from north to south):

- A shrine of Harpocrates in the Serapeum of Alexandria
- Reconstruction of the Naos of the Temple of Mut, Khonsu, and Astarte at Tanis
- The east gate of the Temple of Ptah at Memphis
- A new temple for Hathor at Cusae
- A new temple of Nemty at Tjebu
- Extensions to the Temple of Min and Isis at Koptos
- Decorative work on the great gateway of the Precinct of Montu and a chapel of Khonsu-Neferhotep at Karnak, Thebes
- Shrine for Hathor and Maat at Deir el-Medina, west of Thebes
- Decorative work on the temple of the Theban triad at the Kharga Oasis
- Completion of the Temple of Montu at Medamud
- Decorative work and a sanctuary of Arensnuphis at Philae
- Completion of the temple of Isis on Sehel Island, Aswan
- Reconstruction of the temple of Thoth at Dakka

=== Literature ===
Ptolemy IV was also devoted to religious and literary pursuits. He built a temple to Homer in Alexandria and financed festivals for the Muses, both in Alexandria and in the valley of the Muses in Thespiae in Boeotia. He also composed a tragedy on Adonis, on which his courtier Agathocles wrote a commentary.

=== Luxury ===
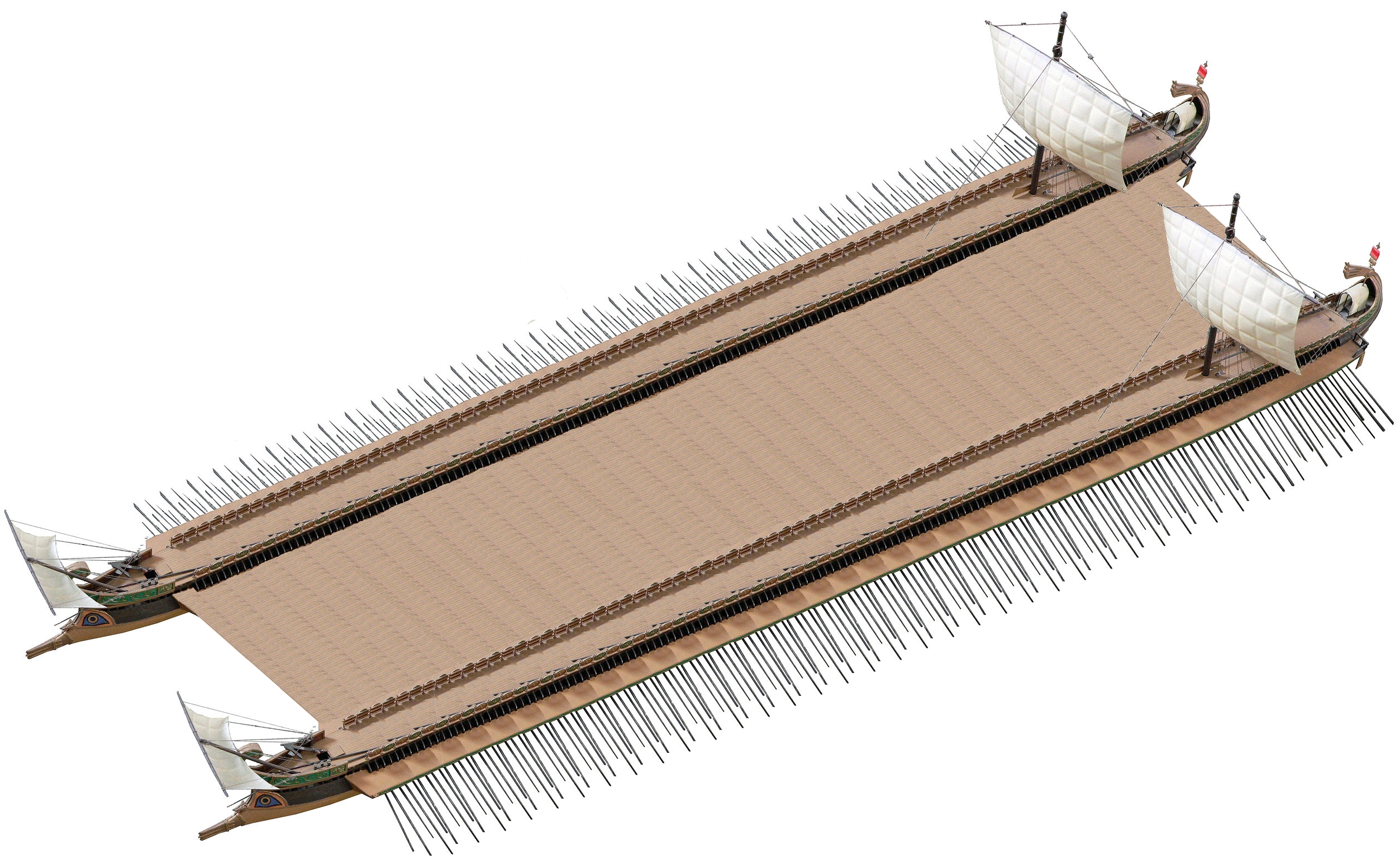
Speculative illustration of the Tessarakonteres with catamaran hulls, as proposed by Lionel Casson

Ptolemy IV is said to have built a giant ship known as the tessarakonteres ("forty-rowed"), a huge galley and possibly the largest human-powered vessel ever built. This showpiece galley was described by Callixenus of Rhodes, writing in the 3rd century BC, and quoted by Athenaeus in the 2nd century AD. Plutarch also mentions that Ptolemy Philopator owned this immense vessel in his Life of Demetrios. According to these sources, the ship was 128 m long and required 4,000 oarsmen. The appearance and structure of this ship have been much discussed in modern scholarship. Lionel Casson proposes that it was a catamaran. It is generally agreed that the tessarakonteres served as a pleasure boat, not a military vessel.

== Legacy and reception ==
The main surviving account of Ptolemy IV's life and character is provided by the historian Polybius. He presents Ptolemy IV as the archetypal bad king, entirely focused on luxury and court ceremony and completely neglecting of politics, foreign affairs, and military pursuits, which he left entirely to Sosibius. According to Polybius, this neglect was the cause of the disasters of his reign, including his death. Polybius was not a contemporary of Ptolemy IV; he probably drew his account from two earlier works which are now lost: the Histories of Phylarchus and The Stories about Philopator by Ptolemy of Megalopolis. Both of these also seem to have criticised Ptolemy IV for his luxuriousness. However, for contemporaries, luxury (tryphe) was often presented as a virtue, which demonstrated a king's ability and willingness to make benefactions. It is possible that the surviving source tradition has taken efforts to advertise this virtue and twisted them into a negative account.

Ptolemy IV is a major character in the deuterocanonical biblical book 3 Maccabees, which was probably written in the first century AD. In this work, set after the Battle of Raphia, the king is presented as an oppressive tyrant who transgresses divine law by trying to enter the temple at Jerusalem and then launches an attempt to wipe out the Jews by gathering them all in the hippodrome at Alexandria and having them trampled by drunken elephants. These plans are repeatedly thwarted by the divine intervention of Yahweh. In the end, Ptolemy IV recants and grants extensive privileges to the Jews. It is not clear that this work indicates the existence of a negative Jewish tradition about Ptolemy. It may simply be using him to make a general moral point about the relative strength of secular and divine authorities. Some scholars argue that Ptolemy's character in this work was actually based on the Roman emperor Caligula and his violations of Jewish sensibilities.

== Marriage and issue ==
Ptolemy IV married his sister Arsinoe III. Their only son, Ptolemy V, was born in 210 BC. Ptolemy IV may also have had a short-lived illegitimate son by his mistress Agathoclea in late c. 210 BC. However, it has been suggested that this child may actually have been Ptolemy V, on the basis of a passage written by the geographer Strabo.

== Bibliography ==
- Clayton, Peter A. (2006). Chronicles of the Pharaohs: the reign-by-reign record of the rulers and dynasties of ancient Egypt. Thames & Hudson. ISBN 0-500-28628-0.
- Hölbl, Günther (2001). A History of the Ptolemaic Empire. London & New York: Routledge. ISBN 0415201454.

Ptolemy IV Philopator Ptolemaic Dynasty Born: Unknown Died: 204 BC
Preceded by Ptolemy III	Pharaoh of Egypt; 221–204 BC	Succeeded by Ptolemy V
