= 300s BC (decade) =

Decade

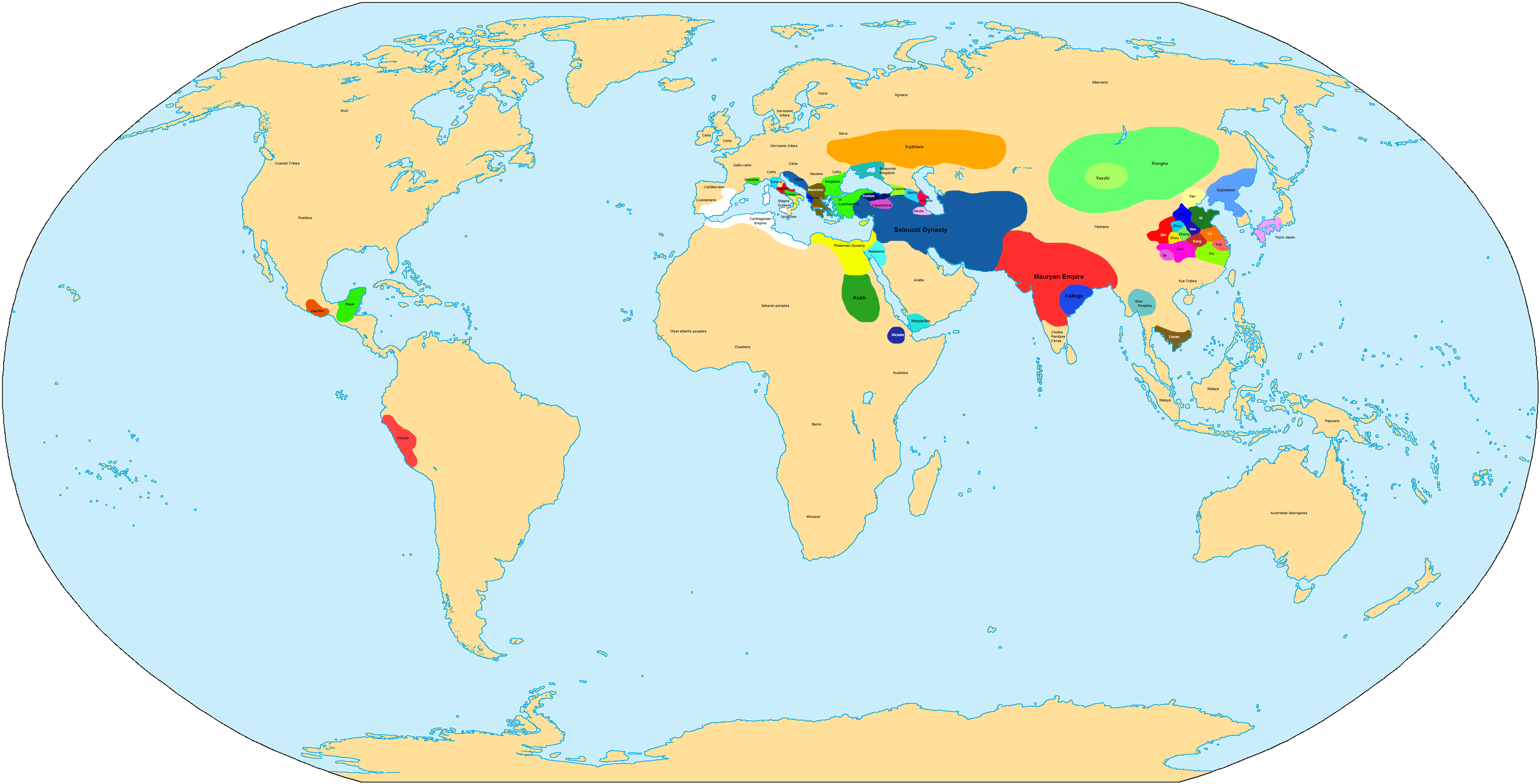
Map of the world in 300 BC.

This article concerns the period 309 BC – 300 BC.

== Events ==
=== 309 BC ===
==== By place ====
====== Asia Minor ======
- Ptolemy I Soter personally commands a fleet that takes the coastal regions of Lycia and Caria from Antigonus I Monophthalmus, capturing the cities of Phaselis, Xanthos, Kaunos, Iasos and Myndus.

====== Thrace ======
- Lysimachus, the Macedonian ruler of Thrace and one of diadochi, founds the city of Lysimachia on the north-western extremity of the Thracian Chersonese (the modern Gallipoli peninsula) to serve as his capital.

====== Greece ======
- Cassander, who has held Roxana, widow of Alexander the Great, in prison for a number of years, has her put to death along with her young son Alexander, the nominal King Alexander IV of Macedon.
- Antigonus attempts to renew his alliance with the Macedonian general and former regent Polyperchon, who still controls part of the Peloponnesus. He sends Heracles, the illegitimate son of Alexander the Great, to Polyperchon to be treated as a pretender to the throne of Macedonia.
- Polyperchon manages to form an army consisting of 20,000 infantry and 1,000 cavalry and challenges Cassander's army. Instead of fighting, Cassander starts negotiations with Polyperchon. By offering to make him a general of his own army and placing him as governor of Peloponnesus, he convinces Polyperchon to change allegiance to him instead of Heracles. As a result, Polyperchon murders Heracles and his mother Barsine.
- Areus I succeeds his grandfather Cleomenes II as king of Sparta.
- A census is carried out in Athens. 21,000 citizens, 10,000 foreign residents and 400,000 others – women, children and slaves – are living in the city.
- Ptolemy arrives at Kos and sends for Ptolemaeus (the nephew of Antigonus – who has revolted against Antigonus) to join him to discuss strategy. After finding out Ptolemaeus plans to take over his army and fleet, Ptolemy forces him to commit suicide.

====== Carthage ======
- Since 480 BC, an aristocratic Council of Elders has effectively ruled Carthage. The titular king of Carthage, Bomilcar, attempts a coup to restore the monarchy to full power. His attempt fails, which leads to Carthage becoming, in name as well as in fact, a republic.
- Leaving his brother Antander to continue the defence of Syracuse, Agathocles lands in North Africa with the aim of distracting the Carthaginians from their siege of Syracuse. Agathocles concludes a treaty with Ophellas, ruler of Cyrenaica. He then takes advantage of the civil unrest in Carthage and nearly succeeds in conquering the city.

====== Roman Republic ======
- The Samnites again rise against Rome. Lucius Papirius Cursor is appointed dictator for the second time and wins a great victory at Longula over the Samnites.

====== China ======
- Soon after the State of Qin has conquered the State of Shu (in modern-day Sichuan province), they employ the Shu engineer Bi Ling to create the Guanxian irrigation system, which will eventually provide for over five million people in an area of 40 to 50 square miles (130 km^{2}), still in use today.

=== 308 BC ===
==== By place ====
====== Mesopotamia/Babylonia ======
- Antigonus marches his main army east to confront Seleucus. The Antigonid and Seleucid armies meet somewhere in southern Mesopotamia or northern Babylonia and a battle is fought to a draw. The next morning Seleucus launches a surprise attack on Antigonus' camp and wins a simple victory. After his defeat Antigonus gives up on his ambitions to reconquer the eastern provinces.
- Seleucus marches east and continues his conquest of the eastern provinces of the Macedonian Empire; the so called Upper Satrapies.

====== Greece ======
- Ptolemy crosses from Asia Minor into Greece, where he takes possession of Corinth, Sicyon and Megara.
- Ptolemy makes peace with Cassander
- Cleopatra of Macedon is assassinated by the order of Antigonus

====== Italy ======
- The Second Samnite War escalates when the tribes of the central Apennines, the Umbrians, Picentini, and Marsians join the war against Rome. However, Rome is able to control the uprising.
- The Etruscans sue for peace with Rome, which is granted by the Romans on severe terms.

====== North Africa ======
- The Carthaginians send out an army to coerce the Zuphones, a Numidian tribe, back into their alliance with Carthage; they are successful in their endeavour.
- Agathocles leaves his main army under the command of his son Archagathus encamped before Tunis while he, with a strikeforce of 8,000 infantry, 800 cavalry and 50 chariots, marches after the Carthaginian army.
- The Carthaginians send the Numidians to harass Agathocles' strike force, the skirmishing draws in more and more troops until it eventually leeds to a battle which is won by Agathocles.
- While Agathocles was in pursuit of the defeated Carthaginian army, the Numidians (who had retreated from the battle earlier on) attack his camp and ride off with a part of his army's booty. Agathocles returns to his camp, divides what is left of the booty (so no one can complain) and sets up a victory trophy.
- Agathocles sends Orthon the Syracusan to Cyrene to request aid in subduing Carthage from Ophellas (Ptolemy's governor of Cyrenaica).
- Ophellas recruits an army of 10,000 infantry, 600 cavalry and 100 chariots for his campaign in support of Agathocles.
- After a arduous march from Cyrenaica to Carthaginian Libya Ophellas' forces link up with Agathocles' army.
- Agathocles lures Ophellas into a false sense of security and launches a surprise attack on his camp. Ophellas is killed in the fighting and Agathocles takes over Ophellas' army, adding its numbers to his own.
- While the Carthaginian army is away from the city, Bomilcar tries to make himself tyrant of Carthage. He fails and is executed.

=== 307 BC ===
==== By place ====
====== Babylonia ======
- Antigonus makes peace with Seleucus, who is left free to consolidate his empire in the east.

====== Syria ======
- Antigonus founds the city of Antigoneia on the Orontes intended to become his eastern capital.

====== Asia Minor ======
- Antigonus prepares an expedition to Greece under his son Demetrius. They gather a fleet of 250 ships and a large army in western Asia Minor. Antigonus gives his son 5.000 talents and some of his top officers, chief among them Medius of Larissa and Aristodemus of Miletus.

====== Greece ======
- At the beginning of June (the 26th day of the Attic month of Thargelion: Plut. Dem. 8,3) Demetrius, son of Antigonus, launches a surprise attack on Pireaus, Athens' harbour; his forces are able to secure control of the entire port city, except the fortress on the Munychia which remains in the hands of Dionysius, the commander of Cassander's garrison in Athens.
- Demetrius of Phalerum, who ruled Athens for 10 years with the support of Cassander, recognizes his position has become untenable. He opens up negotiations, and after several diplomatic exchanges involving Aristodemus of Miletus, Antigonus top diplomat, he is given safe conduct to Thebes. Eventually he settles in Alexandria
- Demetrius captures the fortress on the Munychia and razes it to the ground. The old democracy, with the old constitution, is re-established in Athens under the leadership of Stratocles and Demochares. The grateful Athenians honour Antigonus and Demetrius as divine saviours (theoi soteres).
- Demetrius captures Megara and there he restores the old constitution as well.
- Antigonus gives Athens control of the island of Lemnos and Imbros.
- Upon becoming ruler of Epirus, Pyrrhus allies himself with his brother-in-law, Demetrius and through him with Antigonus.

====== North Africa ======
- Agathocles, the tyrant of Syracuse, (who has been campaigning in North Africa for several years) launches a surprise attack on Utica. He captures around 300 citizens outside the walls and tries to negotiate a surrender of the city; Utica refuses. Agathocles then uses the prisoners as human shields by binding them to his siege engines.
- Agathocles assaults the walls of Utica. The Uticans, despite having to inflict death and injury on their fellow citizens, fiercely defend their city. Eventually, Agathocles' army is able to break into the city, they sacked the city and left behind a garrison.
- Agathocles besieges and takes a town called Hippu Acra. After capturing Hippu Acra several towns and cities come over to his side; even some Numidian tribes start sending their warriors to join Agathocles.
- With his expeditionary army now superior in numbers to the Carthaginians, Agathocles decides to leave his son Archagathus in command of the African campaign and return to Sicily. He starts constructing transports and when enough ships have been built sets sail for Sicily.
- Archagathus sends Eumachus, one of his father's generals, on two successful inland campaigns. On both occasions Eumachus gained a lot of war booty.
- Carthage musters (30,000 soldiers in total) and sends out three armies; one inland, one into the midlands, and one against the cities along the coast.
- Archagathus counters by dividing his army in three and sending them against the Carthaginian armies. Unfortunately for the Greeks, one army (commanded by Aeschrion) gets ambushed and another (commanded by Eumachus) is defeated in battle. Archagathus retreats to Tunis, regroups his army and sends messengers to his father in Sicily to inform him on the situation .The Carthaginians concentrate their forces at Tunis as well and start a blockade of the city.
- Agathocles returns to his expeditionary army. Trying to restore his army's moral, he fights a battle under less than ideal conditions and suffers a bloody defeat (losing 3,000 soldiers).
- During a victory ceremony involving human sacrifice (the Carthaginians sacrificed prisoners of war by burning them alive) the Carthaginian camp catches fire, in the ensuing panic the Carthaginian army breaks and flees back to Carthage.
- 5,000 Libyans deserters, who came fleeing back to Agathocles' camp, cause panic in the Greek camp, scattering the army.
- After the lost battle and the night-time panic, all his Libyan allies desert. With his army in no condition to fight on, Agathocles decides to return to Sicily.
- Agathocles abandons his army and his sons and secretly sails back to Sicily. His soldiers kill his sons in anger.

====== Sicily ======
- Xenodocus, a general from Acragas, leads an army of 10,000 infantry and 1,000 cavalry against Agathocles' generals on Sicily. Leptines and Demophilus, two of Agathocles' generals, oppose Xenoducus with 8,200 infantry and 1,200 cavalry. Xenoducus is defeated and retreats to Acragas. As a result of this defeat the people of Acragas give up the fight against Agathocles.
- Agathocles puts in at Selinus, marches on Heraclea (probably Heraclea Minoa) and forces its people to submit once more. He then marches across the island on the city of Therma, makes a treaty with its people and removes its Carthaginian garrison. After taking Cephaloedium (near Therma), he marches back south taking the cities of Centuripa and Sicily.
- Deinocrates, the leader of the exiles, proclaims himself the champion of common liberty and uses this to gather the bulk of Agathocles' enemies into one army. After mustering an army of 20,000 infantry and 1,500 cavalry, he marches on Agathocles, who refuses to do battle and retreats to Syracuse.
- Receiving word of the losses that had been inflicted on his expeditionary army (commanded by his son Archagathus) in Africa, Agathocles equips 17 warships to go to his son's aid. While breaking through the Carthaginian blockade, he is able to defeat his opponents' fleet.
- Leptines, one of Agathocles' generals, defeats Xenodocus for the second time.
- Agathocles purges Syracuse of his opponents; 500 citizens are executed. With the city secure in his loyalty he sets sail for Africa.
- After meeting disaster in Africa (losing his army and two of his sons), Agathocles returns to Sicily. In dire need of cash, he razes the city of Segesta.

====== China ======
- The Chinese King Wuling of Zhao reforms the military of the State of Zhao by putting more emphasis on cavalry over charioteers.

==== By topic ====
====== Philosophy ======
- Epicureanism, a system of philosophy based upon the teachings of Epicurus, is founded (approximate date).

=== 306 BC ===
==== By place ====
====== Cyprus ======
- Demetrius Poliorcetes lands on Cyprus and besieges Menelaus, brother of Egypt's ruler, Ptolemy I Soter, at Salamis. Ptolemy Soter, coming to his brother's aid, is decisively defeated in the Battle of Salamis. The battle completely destroys the naval power of Egypt and results in the capture of Cyprus by Demetrius. This gives Demetrius' father, Antigonus I Monophthalmus, control of the Aegean and the eastern Mediterranean.

====== Syria ======
- Antigonus I Monophthalmus proclaims himself king of Asia Minor and northern Syria thus commencing the Antigonid dynasty. He appoints his son Demetrius king and co-regent.

====== Egypt ======
- Antigonus Monophthalmus tries to follow up his victory in Cyprus by invading Egypt with a large army and a formidable fleet, but Ptolemy Soter successfully holds the frontier against him. However, the year's events mean that Ptolemy no longer engages in overseas expeditions against Antigonus.

====== Thrace ======
- A four-drachma coin, picturing Alexander the Great, is issued by Lysimachos from this time until 281 BC. At least one of them is now preserved at the British Museum in London.

=== 305 BC ===
==== By place ====
====== Seleucid Empire ======
- Seleucus, former officer of Alexander the Great, considers himself emperor of Persia. He attempts to recover lands taken by Chandragupta that had been a part of Alexander's Empire. Seleucus establishes Seleucia on the Tigris River as his capital.

====== Syria ======
- Antigonus I Monophthalmus sends his son Demetrius to initiate the Siege of Rhodes, as the city has refused him armed support against Ptolemy.

====== Italy ======
- The Romans defeat the Paeligni and take their land, some (those who look well disposed towards Rome) they grant citizenship.
- The Roman consuls, Marcus Fulvius Curvus Paetinus and Lucius Postumius Megellus, decisively defeat the Samnites in the Battle of Bovianum to end the Second Samnite War.

=== 304 BC ===
==== By place ====
====== Greece ======
- Demetrius shows ingenuity in devising a new siege engine: a wheeled siege tower named Helepolis (or "Taker of Cities"), which stands 40 meters tall and 20 meters wide and weighs 180 tons.
- The Siege of Rhodes ends after a year.
- Demetrius Poliorcetes and the Rhodians come to a truce, with the agreement that the city should be autonomous, should keep its own revenue and that the Rhodians should be allies of Antigonus unless he is at war with Ptolemy.
- Antigonus then concludes a peace treaty and an alliance with the island state, guaranteeing it autonomy and neutrality in his conflicts with Ptolemy.
- Cassander invades Attica and besieges Athens. He captures the island of Salamis off the coast of Athens.
- Demetrius Poliorcetes invades mainland Greece for Asia-Minor, drives Cassander out of central Greece and liberates Athens. In return, the Athenians bestow on him a new religious honour, synnaos (meaning "having the same temple") of the temple of the goddess Athena.

====== Roman Republic ======
- The second Samnite war formally ends with a peace agreement in which the Samnites obtain peace on terms that are severe but not as crushing as those agreed by the Romans with the Etruscans four years earlier. Under the peace, Rome gains no territory, but the Samnites renounce their hegemony over Campania. Rome is also successful in ending the revolts amongst the tribes surrounding Roman territory.

====== Sicily ======
- The tyrant Agathocles takes on the title of King of Sicily. He extends his influence into southern Italy and the Adriatic.

====== India ======
- The Mauryan emperor Chandragupta defeats Seleucus I Nicator as he tries to invade India.

=== 303 BC ===
==== By place ====
====== Seleucid Empire ======
- Seleucus I Nicator expands his kingdom throughout Persia as far east as India, but his advance is eventually halted by Chandragupta Maurya, the founder of the Maurya dynasty of India. In a pact concluded by the two leaders, Seleucus agrees to territorial concessions in exchange for 500 war-trained elephants.
- Seleucus refounds the town of Orrhoa in northern Mesopotamia as a military colony and mixes Greek settlers with its eastern population. He names Edessa in memory of the ancient capital of Macedon.

====== Greece ======
- Cassander and Lysimachus persuade Seleucus and Ptolemy to join them in trying to destroy Antigonus.
- Demetrius Poliorcetes invades the Peloponnese and occupies Corinth, Sicyon, and Argos in the Peloponnese, and Achaea, Elis and almost all of Arcadia join his side.

====== Italy ======
- The citizens of Tarentum seek the help of the Spartan general, Cleonymus. He is able to pacify the Lucanians with the agreement of the Romans.

=== 302 BC ===
==== By place ====
====== Asia Minor ======
- Following their agreement to work together to defeat Antigonus, Seleucus invades Asia Minor from Babylonia, while Ptolemy attacks Syria and Lysimachus moves into the western part of Asia Minor.
- Docimus, the regent of Phrygia, and Phoenix, the strategos of Lycia, desert Antigonus.
- The Macedonian general, Philetaerus, moves his allegiance from Antigonus to Antigonus' rival, Lysimachus. In return, Lysimachus makes Philetaerus guardian of the fortress of Pergamum with its treasure of some 9,000 talents.

====== Greece ======
- Antigonus' son Demetrius Poliorcetes attacks Cassander's forces in Thessaly. Cassander loses his possessions south of Thessaly to Demetrius. Antigonus and Demetrius crown their success by renewing the pan-Hellenic league. Ambassadors from all the Hellenic states (with the exception of Sparta, Messenia and Thessaly) meet at Corinth to elect Antigonus and Demetrius protectors of the new league.
- As Antigonus is finding his enemies closing in on him, a truce is made and the gains by Demetrius have to be abandoned. Demetrius reaches Ephesus to support his father.
- Pyrrhus is dethroned as King of Epirus by an uprising and joins Demetrius while in exile.

=== 301 BC ===
==== By place ====
====== Asia Minor ======
- In the Battle of Ipsus in Phrygia, the armies of Antigonus, the ruler of Syria, Asia Minor, Phoenicia and Judea, and his son Demetrius Poliorcetes are defeated by the forces of Lysimachus and Seleucus. Antigonus is killed in the battle.
- Antigonus' defeat and death secures Cassander's control of Macedonia. Through this victory, Lysimachus is able to add the greater part of Asia Minor to his European possessions while Seleucus now controls most of Syria. However, Demetrius is able to keep a foothold in Greece.

====== Seleucid Empire ======
- The southern part of Syria is occupied by Ptolemy.

=== 300 BC ===
==== By place ====
====== Greece ======
- Pilgrims travel to the healing temples of Asclepieion to be cured of their ills. After a ritual purification the followers bring offerings or sacrifices.

====== Egypt ======
- Pyrrhus, the King of Epirus, is taken as a hostage to Egypt after the Battle of Ipsus and makes a diplomatic marriage with the princess Antigone, daughter of Ptolemy and Berenice.
- Ptolemy concludes an alliance with King Lysimachus of Thrace and gives him his daughter Arsinoe II in marriage.

====== China ======
- Warring States period

====== Seleucid Empire ======
- Seleucus founds the city of Antioch, some 20 miles up the Orontes River, naming it after his father.
- After the death of his wife Apama, Seleucus marries Stratonice, daughter of Demetrius Poliorcetes.

==== By topic ====
====== Art ======
- In Pella, the capital of Macedonia, the artist Gnosis creates his Stag Hunt mosaic floor decoration.

== Births ==
309 BC

- Ptolemy II Philadelphus, King of Egypt (d. 246 BC)

308 BC

- Hiero II, Greek Sicilian tyrant and king of Syracuse (approximate date)
- Zhao Sheng, Chinese chancellor of the Zhao State (approximate date)

305 BC

- Zou Yan, Chinese philosopher (d. 240 BC)
- Arsinoe I, queen of Egypt

304 BC

- Ashoka, Indian emperor and ruler of the Maurya Empire in present-day Eastern India 268–232 BC (d. 232 BC)
- Erasistratus, Greek anatomist and physician (approximate date)

303 BC

- Xiaowen of Qin, 34th Ruler of Qin (d. 251 BC)

302 BC

- Maharani Devi, Mauryan empress and wife of Ashoka
- Xiaowen of Qin, Chinese king of the Qin State (d. 250 BC)

== Deaths ==
309 BC

- King Alexander IV of Macedon (b. 323 BC)
- Cleomenes II, Agiad King of Sparta
- Heracles, illegitimate son of Alexander the Great and claimant to the throne of Macedon (b. 327 BC)
- Ptolemy (general) general of Antigonus I Monophthalmus
- Roxana, wife of Alexander the Great, and mother of Alexander IV of Macedon
- Zhang Yi, strategist of the Chinese state of Qin

308 BC

- Cleopatra of Macedon, sister of Alexander the Great and daughter of King Philip II of Macedon and Olympias (b. c. 356 BC)
- Ophellas, ruler of Cyrenaica (governor for Ptolemy).

307 BC

- Archagathus, son of Agathocles the tyrant of Syracuse.
- Heracleides, son of Agathocles the tyrant of Syracuse.

306 BC

- Philip, youngest son of Antigonus Monophthalmus.
- Dionysius of Heraclea, tyrant of Heraclea Pontica.

305 BC

- Tiberius Minucius Augurinus

302 BC

- Mithridates II of Cius, ruler of Cius in Mysia from 337 to 302 BC

301 BC

- Antigonus I Monophthalmus, Macedonian general under Alexander the Great who founded and became the first king of the Macedonian dynasty of the Antigonids (b. 382 BC)
- Aristobulus of Cassandreia, Greek historian (b. ca. 375 BC)
