= Theoxena of Egypt =

Theoxena, also known as Theoxena the Younger to distinguish her from her mother (Greek: Θεόξενα, flourished possibly late second half of 4th century BC and first half of 3rd century BC), was a Syracusan Greek Princess of Magna Graecia and was a noblewoman of high status.

== Family background ==
Theoxena was a woman of Sicilian origin. She was the daughter born to Agathocles and his third wife Theoxena and had a brother called Archagathus.

Her father Agathocles, was a Greek Tyrant of Syracuse, who later became King of Sicily. Theoxena had two paternal-half posthumous brothers: Archagathus and Agathocles; one paternal half-sister Lanassa who was the second wife of King Pyrrhus of Epirus and a posthumous paternal half-nephew Archagathus. Theoxena was the namesake of her mother.

Her mother Theoxena was a Greek Macedonian noblewoman. She was the second daughter and third child born to the noblewoman Berenice I and her first husband, an obscure nobleman called Philip. Theoxena’s biological maternal grandfather Philip, served as a military officer in the service of the Greek King Alexander the Great and was known in commanding one division of the Phalanx in Alexander’s wars. Theoxena’s maternal grandmother Berenice I, was the great-niece of the powerful Regent Antipater and she was a distant collateral relative to the Argead dynasty. Her full blooded maternal uncle was Magas of Cyrene and her full-blooded maternal aunt was Antigone.

Her biological maternal grandfather Philip died about 318 BC. After his death, Berenice I travelled with her children to live in Egypt, where she eventually married Ptolemy I Soter the first Greek Pharaoh and founder of the Ptolemaic dynasty. Through her grandmother’s second marriage to Ptolemy I, Berenice I was an Egyptian Queen and the Queen mother of the Ptolemaic dynasty, thus her mother was a stepdaughter to Ptolemy I and became an Egyptian Princess. Her maternal grandmother had with Ptolemy I three children; two daughters, Arsinoe II, Philotera and the future Pharaoh Ptolemy II Philadelphus. Arsinoe II, Philotera were her maternal half-aunts, while Ptolemy II was her maternal half-uncle.

== Early life ==
Like her brother, Theoxena was born between 301 BC-298 BC. Along with her brother they were born and raised in Sicily. When Agathocles felt his death was approaching, he had sent away the elder Theoxena and their children to Egypt. Theoxena’s father died in 289 BC and her father declared his kingdom as a democracy on his death. Theoxena, her brother with their mother; spent their remaining youth in Egypt, possibly in the court living with Ptolemy I and Berenice I in Alexandria.

== Adult life ==
Little is known about the adult life of Theoxena. Theoxena married an unknown man. By her husband, Theoxena had two children; one child whose name is unknown, and a son called Agathocles.

Sometime during the reign of Ptolemy II (283 BC-246 BC), he banished her to the Thebaid, perhaps to Coptos. Theoxena had brought false accusations to Ptolemy II involving parties she knew were innocent. The names of these persons are lost, because they were recorded on a papyrus, which has been damaged. It is plausible that these events were connected to the exile of Arsinoe I. Arsinoe I was the first wife of Ptolemy II and was exiled in 274 BC/273 BC.

== Sources ==
- Ancient Library article: Archagathus, No. 1 & 2
- Ancient Library article: Theoxena no. 1
- Ancient Library article: Magas no.1
- Berenice I article at Livius.org
- Ptolemaic Dynasty - Affiliated Lines: The Antipatrids & Agathocles
- Ptolemaic Genealogy: Berenice I
- Ptolemaic Genealogy: Theoxena
- R.S. Bagnall, Archagathos son of Agathocles, Epistates of Libya, Columbia University Department of Greek & Latin, New York, USA, 1976
