= Archagathus of Libya =

Archagathus (Ancient Greek: Ἀρχάγαθος) was a Syracusan from Magna Graecia prince and Ptolemaic official who lived around the late second half of the 4th century BC and first half of the 3rd century BC.

== Family background ==
Archagathus was a man of Sicilian origin and his name was a well-attested local Greek name in Sicily. He was the son born to Agathocles and his third wife Theoxena and had a sister called Theoxena.

His father Agathocles was a Greek Tyrant of Syracuse who later became King of Sicily. Archagathus had two paternal-half posthumous brothers: Archagathus and Agathocles; one paternal half-sister Lanassa who was the second wife of King Pyrrhus of Epirus and a posthumous paternal half-nephew Archagathus. He was the namesake of his posthumous brother, nephew and possibly his paternal grandfather.

His mother Theoxena was a Greek Macedonian noblewoman. She was the second daughter and third child born to the noblewoman Berenice I and her first husband obscure nobleman Philip. Archagathus’ biological maternal grandfather Philip, served as a military officer in the service of the Greek King Alexander the Great and was known in commanding one division of the Phalanx in Alexander’s wars. Archagathus’ maternal grandmother Berenice I, was the great-niece of the powerful Regent Antipater and she was a distant collateral relative to the Argead dynasty. His full blooded maternal uncle was Magas of Cyrene and his full-blooded maternal aunt was Antigone.

His biological maternal grandfather Philip died about 318 BC. After his death, Berenice I travelled with her children to live in Egypt, where she eventually married Ptolemy I Soter the first Greek Pharaoh and founder of the Ptolemaic dynasty. Through his grandmother’s second marriage to Ptolemy I, Berenice I was an Egyptian Queen and the Queen mother of the Ptolemaic dynasty, thus his mother was a stepdaughter to Ptolemy I and became an Egyptian Princess. His maternal grandmother had with Ptolemy I three children; two daughters, Arsinoe II, Philotera and the future Pharaoh Ptolemy II Philadelphus. Arsinoe II, Philotera were his maternal half-aunts, while Ptolemy II was his maternal half-uncle.

== Early life ==
Archagathus was born between 301 BC and 298 BC. Along with his sister they were born and raised in Sicily. When his father Agathocles felt his death was approaching, he had Theoxena and their children sent away to Egypt. Agathocles died in 289 BC and declared his kingdom to be a democracy on his death. Archagathus, his sister with their mother, spent their remaining youth in Egypt, possibly in the court living with Ptolemy I and Berenice I in Alexandria.

== Remaining life ==
Archagathus served in the Ptolemaic administration as an official as an Epistates in Cyrenaica. He served under Ptolemy I Soter (reigned 305 BC-283 BC), Ptolemy II Philadelphus (reigned 283 BC-246 BC) and even possibly under Magas when the latter served as Ptolemaic Governor and later as King of Cyrene (reigned 276 BC–250 BC).

According to surviving evidence, Archagathus was a person of high standing who appeared to be a totally unknown private person and was loyal to his family, in particular to his uncle Magas. We also learn from surviving evidence that Archagathus had a wife, a noblewoman of very high status called Stratonice. There is no record of any children born to him.

Archagathus and Stratonice on a marble piece, made a dedication of a temenos to Isis and Serapis at Alexandria on behalf of his uncle Ptolemy II and his grandmother Berenice I. The record is dated from ca. 283 BC to 278 BC and is on display in the Greco-Roman Museum of Alexandria. The inscription below translated in Greek and English reads:

ὑπὲρ βασιλέως Πτολεμαίου
τοῦ Πτολεμαίου καὶ Βερενίκης
Σωτήρων Άρχάγαθος Άγαθοκλέους
ὁ ἐπιστάτης τῆς Λιβύης
καὶ ἡ γυνὴ Στρατονίκη
Σαράπιδι Ἴσιδι τὸ τέμενος.

King Ptolemy
son of Ptolemy and Berenice
the Saviours Archagathus son of Agathocles
epistates of Libya
and his wife Stratonice
Serapis, Isis of temenos.

== Sources ==
- Ancient Library article: Archagathus, No. 1 & 2
- Ancient Library article: Magas no.1
- Ancient Library article: Theoxena no. 1
- Ptolemaic Genealogy: Theoxena
- Ptolemaic Genealogy: Berenice I
- Ptolemaic Genealogy: Stratonice
- Berenice I article at Livius.org
- Ptolemaic Dynasty - Affiliated Lines: Agathocles
- Ptolemaic Dynasty - Affiliated Lines: The Antipatrids
- R.S. Bagnall, Archagathos son of Agathocles, Epistates of Libya, Columbia University Department of Greek & Latin, New York, USA, 1976
