= Magas of Macedon =

Greek Macedonian nobleman

Magas (Greek: Mάγας) was a Greek Macedonian nobleman who lived in the 4th century BC. His origin is obscure except that he came from the region of Eordaea. Little is known about his life.

Magas married the noblewoman Antigone, the child of Cassander and the niece of the powerful regent Antipater. His marriage to Antigone reveals that Magas was a nobleman of some social status and influence as he married a close relation to the powerful regent and his wife was a distant collateral relative to the Argead dynasty. After Magas married Antigone, they settled in Eordaea. Antigone bore Magas a daughter, his only known child, Berenice I of Egypt. Magas had two namesakes: his grandson Magas of Cyrene and his great-great-grandson Magas of Egypt.

== Family tree of Magas of Macedon ==
Antipater regent of Macedonian Empire	Cassander nobleman from Paliura
Cassander king of Macedonia; 305-297 BC	Antigone of Macedon	Magas of Macedon nobleman from Eordaea
Alexander V king of Macedon; 297-294 BC	Philip nobleman from Macedonia	Berenice I	Ptolemy I king of Egypt	Eurydice
Antigone of Epirus ∞ Pyrrhus I of Epirus	Theoxena Elder ∞ Agathocles tyrant of Syracuse, king of Sicily	Magas of Cyrene king of Cyrene; 276-250 BC ∞ Apama II of Seleucids	Philotera deified	Ptolemy II Philadelphus king of Egypt ∞ 1.Arsinoe I 2.Arsinoe II	Arsinoe II ∞ 1.Lysimachus of Thrace; 2.Ptolemy Keraunos king of Macedonia; 3.Ptolemy II Philadelphus	Ptolemy Keraunos king of Macedon; 281-279 BC ∞ Arsinoe II
Ptolemy military officer	Olympias II ∞ Alexander II of Epirus	Archagathus epistates of Cyrene ∞ Oenanthe	Theoxena Younger	Berenice II ∞ 1.Demetrius the Fair king of Cyrene; 250-249 BC; 2.Ptolemy III Euergetes	(1) Ptolemy III Euergetes king of Egypt ∞ Berenice II	(1) Lysimachus prince	(1) Berenice ∞ Antiochus II Theos emperor of Seleucid Empire	(1) Ptolemy Epigonos kng of Telmessos	(1) Lysimachus prince	(1) Philip prince
Phthia ∞ Demetrius II of Macedon; 239-229 BC	Pyrrhus II king of Epirus; 242-238 BC	Ptolemy king of Epirus; 238-235 BC	Agathocles ∞ Oenanthe	(2) Magas of Egypt died 20 y.o.	Arsinoe III	Ptolemy IV Philopator king of Egypt	Lysimachus king of Telmessos	Epigonos prince
