= Theoxena of Syracuse =

Greek Macedonian noblewoman

Theoxena (Greek: Θεόξενα; before 317 BC – after 289 BC) was a Greek Macedonian noblewoman. Through her mother's second marriage, she was a member of the Ptolemaic dynasty and through marriage was a queen of Sicily, Magna Graecia.

== Family ==
Theoxena was the second daughter and third child of the noblewoman Berenice and her first husband Philip. She had two older siblings: a brother called Magas and a sister called Antigone.

Her father, Philip, was the son of Amyntas by a mother whose name is unknown. Based on the implying of Plutarch (Pyrrhus 4.4), her father was previously married and had children, including daughters born to him. He served as a military officer in the service of the Greek King Alexander the Great and was known in commanding one division of the Phalanx in Alexander's wars.

Her mother Berenice was a noblewoman from Eordeaea. She was the daughter of local obscure nobleman Magas and noblewoman Antigone. Berenice's mother was the niece of the powerful Regent Antipater and was a distant collateral relative to the Argead dynasty. Her name was either chosen by her parents or she was probably named in honour of a relative either from her mother's or father's family.

== Biography ==
About 318 BC, her father died of natural causes. After the death of Theoxena's father, Theoxena's mother took her and her siblings to Egypt where they were a part of the entourage of her mother's second maternal cousin Eurydice. Eurydice was then the wife of Ptolemy I Soter, the first Greek Pharaoh and founder of the Ptolemaic dynasty.

By 317 BC, Ptolemy I fell in love with Berenice and divorced Eurydice to marry her. Her mother through her marriage to Ptolemy I, was an Egyptian queen of the Ptolemaic dynasty. Through her mother's marriage to Ptolemy I, Theoxena was a stepdaughter to Ptolemy I; became an Egyptian princess living in her stepfather's court and was a member of the Ptolemaic dynasty. Her mother bore Ptolemy I three children: two daughters, Arsinoe II, Philotera and the future pharaoh Ptolemy II Philadelphus.

Around the year 300 BC, Ptolemy I was in engaged in a round of diplomatic marriages involving his children. Theoxena was a part of his strategy by marrying Agathocles of Syracuse, a Syracusan Greek ruler of Syracuse and later king of Sicily. Theoxena married Agathocles as his third and final wife. From her marriage to Agathocles, reveals and indicates that Theoxena was a noblewoman of high status, in particular when she lived in Sicily. Little is known on her relationship with her husband and her life in Sicily. Agathocles became tyrant of Syracuse in 317 BC and declared himself Sicilian King in 304 BC.

She was a stepmother to Agathocles’ daughter, Lanassa who was the second wife of King Pyrrhus of Epirus. Pyrrhus was previously married to Theoxena's first sister, Antigone. Theoxena had with Agathocles a son, Archagathus and a daughter, Theoxena. Her children with Agathocles are only known through surviving archaeological evidence.

When Agathocles felt his death was approaching, he sent Theoxena and their children to Egypt. Agathocles died in 289 BC and declared his kingdom a democracy on his death. Theoxena spent her remaining years living in Egypt with her family. Theoxena and Agathocles’ children and their descendants rose to very high prominence in the reigns of Theoxena's half-brother Ptolemy II; her nephew Ptolemy III Euergetes and her great-nephew Ptolemy IV Philopator.

== Sources ==
- Ancient Library article: Theoxena no. 1
- Ancient Library article: Magas no.1
- Berenice I article at Livius.org
- Ptolemaic Dynasty - Affiliated Lines: The Antipatrids & Agathocles
- Ptolemaic Genealogy: Berenice I
- Ptolemaic Genealogy: Theoxena
- W. Heckel, Who's who in the age of Alexander the Great: prosopography of Alexander's empire, Wiley-Blackwell, 2006
