= Archagathus =

Archagathus (Ancient Greek: Ἀρχάγαθος) was an ancient well-attested local Greek name in Sicily and can refer to:

- Archagathus (son of Agathocles of Syracuse) (flourished 4th century BC), a Syracusan Greek Prince and first son of Agathocles of Syracuse
- Archagathus (grandson of Agathocles of Syracuse) (flourished 4th century BC), a Syracusan Greek Prince, son to the above named and grandson of Agathocles of Syracuse
- Archagathus of Libya (flourished 4th century BC and 3rd century BC), a Syracusan Greek Prince and a posthumous paternal half-brother to the first named Archagathus. He was the third son of Agathocles of Syracuse from his third wife Theoxena of Syracuse
- Archagathus (son of Lysanias), a physician who lived in the 2nd century BC
- Caecilius of Calacte, originally called Archagathus a Silcian Jewish rhetorician that lived during the reign of the first Roman Emperor Augustus
