= 307 BC =

307 BC in various calendars
- Gregorian calendar: 307 BC; CCCVII BC
- Ab urbe condita: 447
- Ancient Egypt era: XXXIII dynasty, 17
- Pharaoh: Ptolemy I Soter, 17
- Ancient Greek Olympiad (summer): 118th Olympiad, year 2
- Assyrian calendar: 4444
- Balinese saka calendar: N/A
- Bengali calendar: −900 – −899
- Berber calendar: 644
- Buddhist calendar: 238
- Burmese calendar: −944
- Byzantine calendar: 5202–5203
- Chinese calendar: 癸丑年 (Water Ox); 2391 or 2184 — to — 甲寅年 (Wood Tiger); 2392 or 2185
- Coptic calendar: −590 – −589
- Discordian calendar: 860
- Ethiopian calendar: −314 – −313
- Hebrew calendar: 3454–3455
- Hindu calendars
- Vikram Samvat: −250 – −249
- Shaka Samvat: N/A
- Kali Yuga: 2794–2795
- Holocene calendar: 9694
- Iranian calendar: 928 BP – 927 BP
- Islamic calendar: 957 BH – 955 BH
- Javanese calendar: N/A
- Julian calendar: N/A
- Korean calendar: 2027
- Minguo calendar: 2218 before ROC 民前2218年
- Nanakshahi calendar: −1774
- Seleucid era: 5/6 AG
- Thai solar calendar: 236–237
- Tibetan calendar: ཆུ་མོ་གླང་ལོ་ (female Water-Ox) −180 or −561 or −1333 — to — ཤིང་ཕོ་སྟག་ལོ་ (male Wood-Tiger) −179 or −560 or −1332

Year 307 BC was a year of the pre-Julian Roman calendar. At the time, it was known as the Year of the Consulship of Caecus and Violens (or, less frequently, year 447 Ab urbe condita). The denomination 307 BC for this year has been used since the early medieval period, when the Anno Domini calendar era became the prevalent method in Europe for naming years.

== Events ==
=== By place ===
==== Babylonia ====
- Antigonus makes peace with Seleucus, who is left free to consolidate his empire in the east.

==== Syria ====
- Antigonus founds the city of Antigoneia on the Orontes intended to become his eastern capital.

==== Asia Minor ====
- Antigonus prepares an expedition to Greece under his son Demetrius. They gather a fleet of 250 ships and a large army in western Asia Minor. Antigonus gives his son 5.000 talents and some of his top officers, chief among them Medius of Larissa and Aristodemus of Miletus.

==== Greece ====
- At the beginning of June (the 26th day of the Attic month of Thargelion: Plut. Dem. 8,3) Demetrius, son of Antigonus, launches a surprise attack on Pireaus, Athens' harbour; his forces are able to secure control of the entire port city, except the fortress on the Munychia which remains in the hands of Dionysius, the commander of Cassander's garrison in Athens.
- Demetrius of Phalerum, who ruled Athens for 10 years with the support of Cassander, recognizes his position has become untenable. He opens up negotiations, and after several diplomatic exchanges involving Aristodemus of Miletus, Antigonus top diplomat, he is given safe conduct to Thebes. Eventually he settles in Alexandria
- Demetrius captures the fortress on the Munychia and razes it to the ground. The old democracy, with the old constitution, is re-established in Athens under the leadership of Stratocles and Demochares. The grateful Athenians honour Antigonus and Demetrius as divine saviours (theoi soteres).
- Demetrius captures Megara and there he restores the old constitution as well.
- Antigonus gives Athens control of the island of Lemnos and Imbros.
- Upon becoming ruler of Epirus, Pyrrhus allies himself with his brother-in-law, Demetrius and through him with Antigonus.

==== North Africa ====
- Agathocles, the tyrant of Syracuse, (who has been campaigning in North Africa for several years) launches a surprise attack on Utica. He captures around 300 citizens outside the walls and tries to negotiate a surrender of the city; Utica refuses. Agathocles then uses the prisoners as human shields by binding them to his siege engines.
- Agathocles assaults the walls of Utica. The Uticans, despite having to inflict death and injury on their fellow citizens, fiercely defend their city. Eventually, Agathocles' army is able to break into the city, they sacked the city and left behind a garrison.
- Agathocles besieges and takes a town called Hippu Acra. After capturing Hippu Acra several towns and cities come over to his side; even some Numidian tribes start sending their warriors to join Agathocles.
- With his expeditionary army now superior in numbers to the Carthaginians, Agathocles decides to leave his son Archagathus in command of the African campaign and return to Sicily. He starts constructing transports and when enough ships have been built sets sail for Sicily.
- Archagathus sends Eumachus, one of his father's generals, on two successful inland campaigns. On both occasions Eumachus gained a lot of war booty.
- Carthage musters (30,000 soldiers in total) and sends out three armies; one inland, one into the midlands, and one against the cities along the coast.
- Archagathus counters by dividing his army in three and sending them against the Carthaginian armies. Unfortunately for the Greeks, one army (commanded by Aeschrion) gets ambushed and another (commanded by Eumachus) is defeated in battle. Archagathus retreats to Tunis, regroups his army and sends messengers to his father in Sicily to inform him on the situation. The Carthaginians concentrate their forces at Tunis as well and start a blockade of the city.
- Agathocles returns to his expeditionary army. Trying to restore his army's moral, he fights a battle under less than ideal conditions and suffers a bloody defeat (losing 3,000 soldiers).
- During a victory ceremony involving human sacrifice (the Carthaginians sacrificed prisoners of war by burning them alive) the Carthaginian camp catches fire, in the ensuing panic the Carthaginian army breaks and flees back to Carthage.
- 5,000 Libyans deserters, who came fleeing back to Agathocles' camp, cause panic in the Greek camp, scattering the army.
- After the lost battle and the night-time panic, all his Libyan allies desert. With his army in no condition to fight on, Agathocles decides to return to Sicily.
- Agathocles abandons his army and his sons and secretly sails back to Sicily. His soldiers kill his sons in anger.

==== Sicily ====
- Xenodocus, a general from Acragas, leads an army of 10,000 infantry and 1,000 cavalry against Agathocles' generals on Sicily. Leptines and Demophilus, two of Agathocles' generals, oppose Xenoducus with 8,200 infantry and 1,200 cavalry. Xenoducus is defeated and retreats to Acragas. As a result of this defeat the people of Acragas give up the fight against Agathocles.
- Agathocles puts in at Selinus, marches on Heraclea (probably Heraclea Minoa) and forces its people to submit once more. He then marches across the island on the city of Therma, makes a treaty with its people and removes its Carthaginian garrison. After taking Cephaloedium (near Therma), he marches back south taking the cities of Centuripa and Sicily.
- Deinocrates, the leader of the exiles, proclaims himself the champion of common liberty and uses this to gather the bulk of Agathocles' enemies into one army. After mustering an army of 20,000 infantry and 1,500 cavalry, he marches on Agathocles, who refuses to do battle and retreats to Syracuse.
- Receiving word of the losses that had been inflicted on his expeditionary army (commanded by his son Archagathus) in Africa, Agathocles equips 17 warships to go to his son's aid. While breaking through the Carthaginian blockade, he is able to defeat his opponents' fleet.
- Leptines, one of Agathocles' generals, defeats Xenodocus for the second time.
- Agathocles purges Syracuse of his opponents; 500 citizens are executed. With the city secure in his loyalty he sets sail for Africa.
- After meeting disaster in Africa (losing his army and two of his sons), Agathocles returns to Sicily. In dire need of cash, he razes the city of Segesta.

==== China ====
- The Chinese King Wuling of Zhao reforms the military of the State of Zhao by putting more emphasis on cavalry over charioteers.

=== By topic ===
==== Philosophy ====
- Epicureanism, a system of philosophy based upon the teachings of Epicurus, is founded (approximate date).

== Deaths ==
- Archagathus, son of Agathocles the tyrant of Syracuse.
- Heracleides, son of Agathocles the tyrant of Syracuse.
