= Magas of Cyrene =

Greek king of Cyrenaica from 276 BC to 250 BC

- Basileus
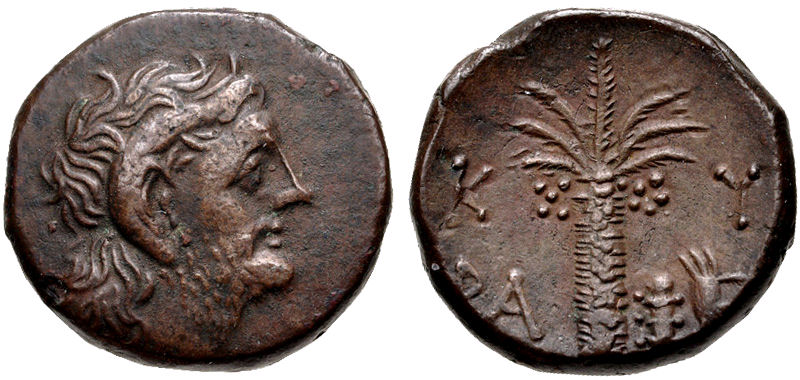
- Magas as king of Cyrene, circa 282/75 to 261 BC. Rev: Palm tree and small silphium and crab symbols.

Governor of Cyrene
- Reign: 300–276 BC
- Predecessor: Ophellas (until 308 BC)

King of Cyrenaica
- Reign: 276–250 BC
- Successor: Berenice II and Demetrius
- Co-regent: Berenice II (from 258 BC)
- Born: c. 320 BC; Macedon
- Died: 250 BC; Cyrene
- Spouse: Apama II
- Issue: Berenice II
- House Dynasty: Kings of Cyrene; Ptolemaic dynasty
- Father: Philip
- Mother: Berenice
- Religion: Greek polytheism

Magas of Cyrene (Ancient Greek: Μάγας ὁ Κυρηναῖος; born before 317 BC – 250 BC, ruled 276 BC – 250 BC) was a Greek King of Cyrenaica. Through his mother’s second marriage to Ptolemy I he became a member of the Ptolemaic dynasty. He managed to wrest independence for Cyrenaica (in modern Libya) from the Greek Ptolemaic dynasty of Ancient Egypt, and became King of Cyrenaica from 276 BC to 250 BC.

== Family background and early life ==
Magas was the first-born son of the Macedonian noblewoman Berenice and her first husband, Philip, who had served as a military officer in the campaigns of Alexander the Great. He had two younger sisters: Antigone of Epirus and Theoxena of Syracuse. His father, Philip, was the son of Amyntas by a mother whose name is unknown. Plutarch (Pyrrhus 4.4) implies that his father was previously married and had children, including daughters born to him. Phillip served as a military officer in the service of the Macedonian king Alexander the Great and was known for commanding one division of the phalanx in Alexander’s wars.

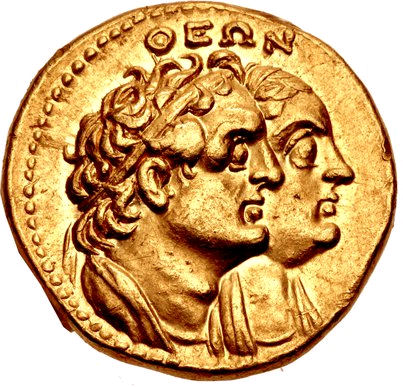
Magas's mother, Berenice I (right), and stepfather, Ptolemy I

Magas's mother, Berenice, was from Eordeaea. She was the daughter of local obscure nobleman Magas and noblewoman Antigone. Berenice’s mother was the niece of the powerful regent Antipater and was a distant collateral relative to the Argead dynasty. He was the namesake of his maternal grandfather.

About 318 BC, Magas's father, Philip, died of natural causes. After her husband's death, Berenice took her children to the Ptolemaic Kingdom, where they were a part of the entourage of Berenice's cousin Eurydice. Eurydice was then the wife of Ptolemy I, the first Greek pharaoh and founder of the Ptolemaic dynasty.

By 317 BC, Ptolemy I fell in love with Berenice and repudiated Eurydice to marry her. Through her marriage to Ptolemy, Berenice became an Egyptian queen and the queen mother of the Ptolemaic dynasty. Magas was thus a stepson to Ptolemy I; he became an Egyptian prince living in his stepfather's court and was a member of the Ptolemaic dynasty. His mother bore Ptolemy I three children: Queen Arsinoe II, Princess Philotera, and King Ptolemy II.

== Governorship and kingship of Cyrenaica ==
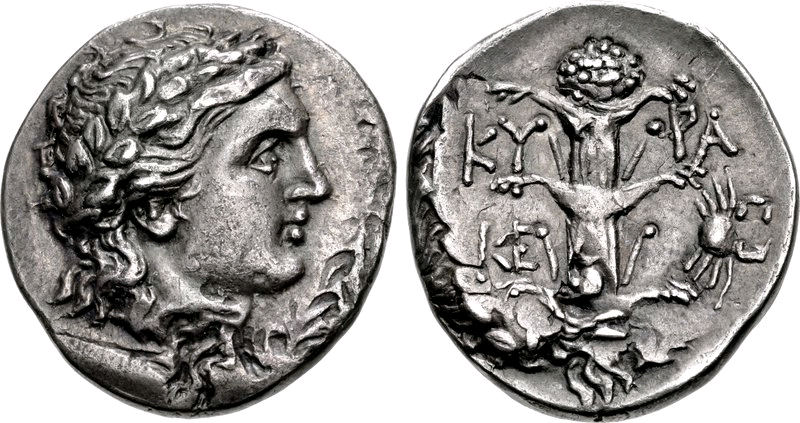
Magas as Ptolemaic governor, first reign, circa 300 - 282/75 BC. Rev: silphium and small crab symbols.

After Agathocles of Syracuse had Ophellas, the governor of Cyrene, put to death in November 308 BC, Magas's step-father Ptolemy exercised direct control over Cyrene. Shortly after Ptolemy declared himself king (c.305 BC), the Cyrenaeans rebelled. Around 300 BC, Ptolemy dispatched Magas, then about 20 years old, to reconquer Cyrene. Magas subsequently served as the province's governor. As a posthumous honor to his biological father, Magas, when he served as a priest of the Greek God Apollo, had dedicated an honorific inscription proudly naming him as ‘the eponymous priest’ and ‘Magas son of Philip’.

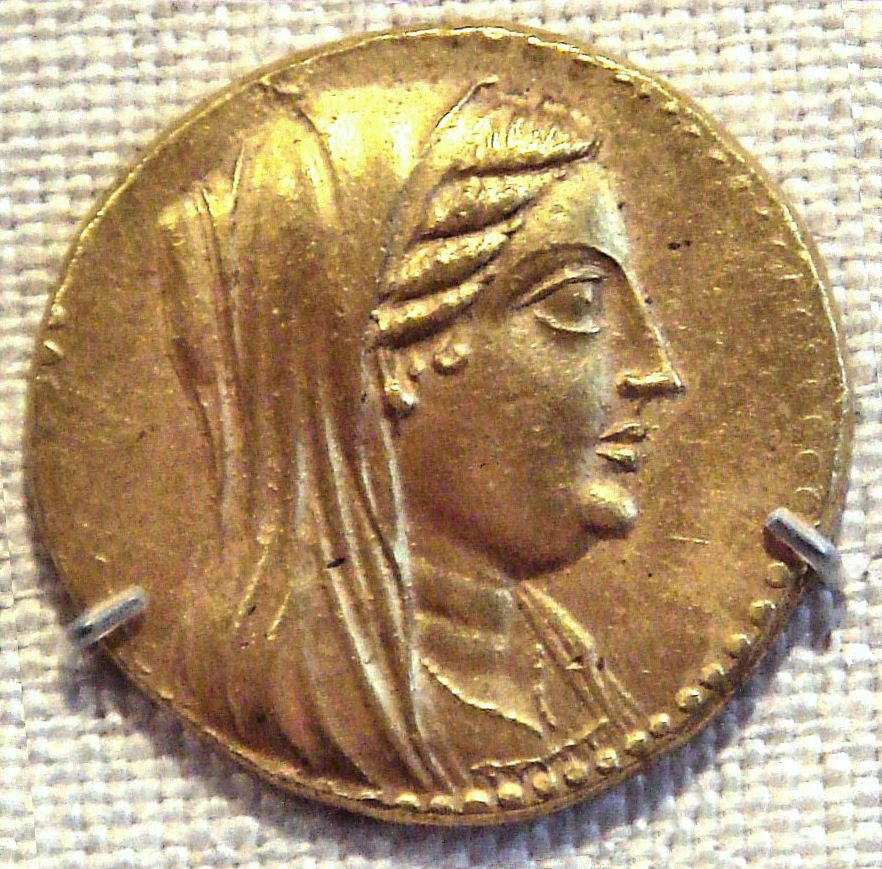
Berenice II was the daughter of Magas of Cyrene.

Following the death of his stepfather Ptolemy I in 283 BC, Magas tried to wrest independence for Cyrenaica from his stepfather's successor, his maternal half-brother Ptolemy Philadelphus, and crowned himself King. The dating of his coronation is disputed; the dates proposed include the early years of Ptolemy II in 283–280 BC and a later date in 276/274 BC. It was the first time Cyrene had a king since Arcesilaus IV around 440 BC. Magas then married Apama II, his third maternal cousin and one of the daughters of Seleucid King Antiochus I Soter and Stratonice of Syria. Antiochus I used his marital alliance to foment a pact to invade Egypt. Apama II and Magas had a daughter called Berenice II, who was their only child.

After some time, Magas opened hostilities against Ptolemy II. The date of this is also disputed and depends on the date of his coronation. Magas was attacking Egypt from the west, as Antiochus I was attacking Palestine. However, Magas had to cancel his operations without results due to an internal revolt of the nomadic Libyan Marmaridae. In the east, Antiochus I suffered defeat against the armies of Ptolemy II.

After his invasion of Egypt, Magas's reign was largely peaceful, an environment that fostered the arts and sciences in Cyrene. Magas is known to have favored the arts and sciences in Cyrene, and was close to the philosophical school of the Cyrenaics, which had arisen in the fourth century BC under Aristippus, a pupil of Socrates. The philosophy of the Cyrenaics under Magas evolved in a way that has similarities with Skepticism, Epicurianism and also Buddhism.

The rivalry between Magas and Ptolemy continued after the military clash of their early reigns for some time. The first signs of a reconciliation between Magas and Ptolemy II may be visible in a document from the 260s. In the treaty that Magas concluded with the Cretan League of the Oreioi, he is styled basileus, while Cyrenaica is referred to as an eparchia (province), suggesting that although Magas retained his royal title, the link with Ptolemaic Egypt had been reasserted. However, the general thrust of the treaty still appears to have been directed against Ptolemy, raising doubts as to whether a full reconciliation had been achieved.

To further mend the dynastic rift, Magas betrothed his only child, Berenice II, to Philadelphus's son, the future Ptolemy III Euergetes, at some point after 259 BC. Magas no doubt wished to secure for his daughter the wealth and power of the Ptolemaic family; for Philadelphus, the agreement offered a western buffer against future incursions into Egypt, access to Cyrene's agricultural riches, which could sustain Egypt in years when the Nile failed to flood and the reintegration of Soter's first external possession into the Ptolemaic orbit.

Magas died in 250 BC after a reign of some fifty years. Agatharchides, as reported by Athenaeus, records that he spent his reign in luxury and never engaged in wars, and that towards the end of his life he had grown so immensely corpulent that he was ultimately choked by his own fat, the result of physical inactivity and excessive eating.

After the death of Magas, Apama II broke the marital alliance between her daughter Berenice II and Ptolemy III and proposed her daughter and the throne to Demetrius the Fair, son of the Antigonid king Demetrius I Poliorcetes, who became the new king of Cyrene. This gave the Antigonids strategic control of the western side of the Ptolemaic Kingdom. After Demetrius was assassinated by Berenice for cheating with her mother Apama, Berenice returned to Egypt to finally marry her original fiancé, Ptolemy III Euergetes.

== Relations with India ==
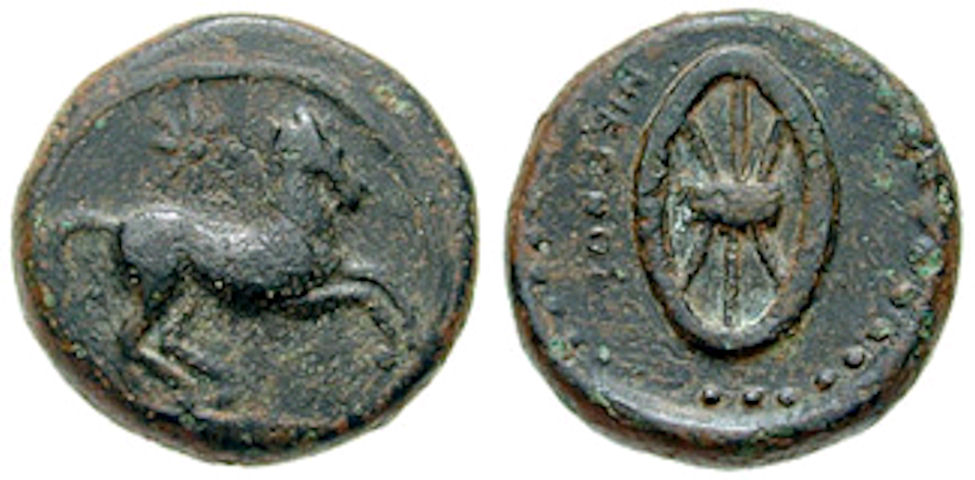
Cyrene coin struck under Ophellas as Ptolemaic governor. Circa 322-313 BC. Æ 19mm (8.14 gm). Horse running right; star above / NIKWNOS, six-spoked wheel.

Magas was known by name to the contemporary Indian Emperor Ashoka, and he may have received Buddhist emissaries from India: indeed Magas is mentioned in the Edicts of Ashoka, as one of the recipients of Ashoka's Buddhist proselytism. Ashoka also claims that he encouraged the development of herbalism, for men and animals, in the territories of the Hellenistic Kings.

Buddhist proselytism at the time of king Ashoka (260–218 BC), according to the Edicts of Ashoka.

Now it is conquest by Dhamma that Beloved-of-the-Gods considers to be the best conquest. And it (conquest by Dhamma) has been won here, on the borders, even six hundred yojanas away, where the Greek king Antiochos rules, beyond there where the four kings named Ptolemy, Antigonos, Magas and Alexander rule, likewise in the south among the Cholas, the Pandyas, and as far as Tamraparni. Here in the king's domain among the Greeks, the Kambojas, the Nabhakas, the Nabhapamktis, the Bhojas, the Pitinikas, the Andhras and the Palidas, everywhere people are following Beloved-of-the-Gods' instructions in Dhamma. Even where Beloved-of-the-Gods' envoys have not been, these people too, having heard of the practice of Dhamma and the ordinances and instructions in Dhamma given by Beloved-of-the-Gods, are following it and will continue to do so.

— Edicts of Ashoka, Rock Edict (S. Dhammika)

There are no records of such emissaries in Western sources. However, the philosopher Hegesias of Cyrene, from the city of Cyrene where Magas ruled in Cyrenaica, is sometimes thought to have been influenced by the teachings of Ashoka's Buddhist missionaries, given the similarity of some of his teachings with Buddhism.

Still, Magas probably was quite knowledgeable about India. His father, Philip, had been a phalanx officer in the campaigns of Alexander the Great. Later, Magas, having been raised in part at the Ptolemaic court, must also have received first-hand accounts of India from his stepfather Ptolemy I, a former general in Alexander's campaigns. The predecessor of Magas in Cyrene, the Ptolemaic governor named Ophellas, had also been one of the Alexander's officers in India, in charge of one of his triremes during the expedition down the Indus River. Magas was probably quite acquainted with matters pertaining to India through his contacts with such veterans of the Indian campaigns.

== See also ==
- List of kings of Cyrene

== Sources ==
- W. Heckel, Who’s who in the age of Alexander the Great: prosopography of Alexander’s empire, Wiley-Blackwell, 2006
- Kainz, Lukas (2022). Die umstrittenen Könige: Untersuchungen zur Stabilität des ptolemäischen Königtums. Von der Thronbesteigung Ptolemaios’ II. bis zum Tod Ptolemaios’ VI. (283/82–145 v. Chr.) [The disputed kings: Studies on the stability of the Ptolemaic monarchy. From the accession of Ptolemy II to the death of Ptolemy VI (283/82–145 BC)]. Hamburg: Dr. Kovač. pp. 79–91. ISBN 978-3-339-13044-0.

Magas of Cyrene Died: 250 BC
Regnal titles
Recreated Title last held by Arcesilaus IV	King of Cyrene; 276 BC – 250 BC with Berenice II (258 BC – 250 BC)	Succeeded by Demetrius and Berenice II
