= Stratonice of Libya =

Stratonice (Greek: Στρατονίκη; fl. possibly late second half of 4th century BC and first half of 3rd century BC) was a Greek noblewoman of very high status and was the wife of the Ptolemaic official Archagathus of Libya.

Stratonice is an unattested person and is only known through surviving evidence. When her husband was an Epistates in Libya serving in Cyrenaica, Stratonice and her husband Archagathus on marble piece made a dedication of a temenos to Isis and Serapis at Alexandria on behalf of Archagathus’ maternal uncle, the Ptolemaic prince Ptolemy II Philadelphus and his maternal grandmother the first Ptolemaic Queen Berenice I of Egypt. The record is dated from ca. 283 BC-278 BC and is on display in the Greco-Roman Museum of Alexandria. The inscription below translated in Greek and English reads:

ὑπὲρ βασιλέως Πτολεμαίου
τοῦ Πτολεμαίου καὶ Βερενίκης
Σωτήρων Άρχάγαθος Άγαθοκλέους
ὁ ἐπιστάτης τῆς Λιβύης
καὶ ἡ γυνὴ Στρατονίκη
Σαράπιδι Ἴσιδι τὸ τέμενος.

King Ptolemy
son of Ptolemy and Berenice
the Saviours Archagathus son of Agathocles
epistates of Libya
and his wife Stratonice
Serapis, Isis of temenos.

Stratonice made a dedication, to Ptolemy II's sister the Ptolemaic princess Arsinoe II. The original statue she dedicated was a Hellenistic original statue of Arsinoe II which must be dated from 280 BC-278 BC. The original Hellenistic statue of Arsinoe II was later copied as a Roman statue. The text from the Roman copy below translated in Greek and English reads:

Βασίλισσαν Ὰρσινόην βασιλέως
Πτολεμαίου καί βασιλίσσης Βερενίκης
Στρατονίκη βασιλέως Δημητρίου

Queen Arsinoe daughter of King
Ptolemy and Queen Berenice
Stratonice daughter of King Demetrius

The inscription reveals she was a daughter of a King Demetrius and there is a possibility that she could identified as an otherwise-unknown daughter of Greek Macedonian King Demetrius I Poliorcetes. According to the suggestions of L. Morretti (RFIC 93, 1965, 73) and R.S. Bagnall (Philologus 120, 1976, 195) that Stratonice may have been the sister of Alexander, son of Demetrius I Poliorcetes and Deidamia. Alexander lived his remaining life as an honorary hostage in Egypt and Stratonice may have accompanied him to Egypt. Alexander and Stratonice may have accompanied their maternal uncle Pyrrhus of Epirus to Egypt in c.299 BC when Pyrrhus lived as a hostage in the country. Stratonice is not to be confused with Stratonice of Syria, the known daughter of Demetrius I Poliorcetes of this name, who married as the second wife of Seleucus I Nicator and the wife of Antiochus I Soter. If this suggestion is correct, Stratonice was born at the same time as her husband between 301 BC-298 BC. There is no record of any children born to her marriage to Archagathus.

Stratonice may have been the same Stratonice who had a celebrated Mausoleum at Eleusis near Alexandria and was a later mistress of Ptolemy II.

== Sources ==
- Ptolemaic Genealogy: Stratonice
- Ptolemaic Genealogy: Theoxena
- R.S. Bagnall, Archagathos son of Agathocles, Epistates of Libya, Columbia University Department of Greek & Latin, New York, USA, 1976
