= Philip (husband of Berenice I of Egypt) =

Greek Macedonian nobleman

Philip (Greek: Φίλιππος, died c. 318 BC) was a Greek Macedonian nobleman who lived during the 4th century BC.

== Early life ==
Philip was the son of Amyntas by a mother whose name is unknown. He served as a military officer in the service of the Greek king Alexander the Great. Philip was known to have commanded one division of the phalanx in Alexander’s wars and, in particular, he commanded one of the divisions of the phalanx at the Battle of the Granicus in May 334 BC. His name does not subsequently appear in the campaigns of Alexander, but can be at least distinctly identified.

Based on information provided by Plutarch (Pyrrhus 4.4), before Philip married Berenice he was already married and had children from those marriages. The identities of his first wife and children are unknown.

== Marriage to Berenice I ==
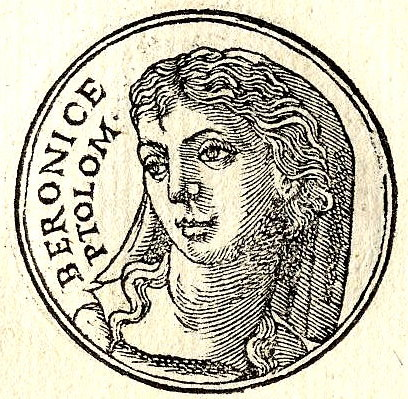
Berenice I from Promptuarii Iconum Insigniorum

In c. 325 BC, Philip married Berenice I as her first husband. Pausanias (1.7.1), criticises his marriage to Berenice I and describes him as "a Macedonian but of no note and of lowly origin". The ancient sources don’t say anything else about him and there is no evidence against this. Philip must have been a nobleman of some social status and influence as he married the great-niece of the powerful Regent Antipater and the grandchild of Antipater’s brother Cassander.

Berenice bore Philip three children:

- Son, Magas
- Daughter, Antigone
- Daughter, Theoxena

== Death ==
Philip died of unknown causes. After his death, Berenice and her children travelled to Egypt, where they were a part of the entourage of Berenice’s second maternal cousin Eurydice. Eurydice was then the wife of Ptolemy I Soter. By 317 BC, Berenice married Ptolemy I and became the queen mother of the Ptolemaic dynasty.

As a posthumous honour to Philip, his son Magas, when he served as a priest of the Greek God Apollo, had dedicated an honorific inscription proudly naming him as "the eponymous priest" and "Magas, son of Philip".

== Family tree of Philip ==
Cassander nobleman	Antipater regent of Macedonian Empire
Amyntas	Magas of Macedon	Antigone
Philip military officer	Berenice I	Ptolemy I Soter king of Egypt	Eurydice
Apama II daughter of Antiochus I Soter; Seleucid emperor	Magas of Cyrene king of Cyrene	3.Theoxena	Agathocles tyrant of Syracuse king of Sicily	2.Alcia
Demetrius the Fair king of Cyrene; Antigonid dynasty	Berenice II	Ptolemy III Euergetes king of Egypt	Antigone	1.Pyrrhus I king of Epirus	(2) Lanassa	2.Demetrius I Poliorketes king of Macedon
Magas of Egypt	Alexander II king of Epirus

== Sources ==
- Ancient Library article: Philippus no. 5
- Ptolemaic Genealogy: Berenice I
- Berenice I article at Livius.org
- Ancient Library article: Magas no.1
- Ptolemaic Genealogy: Magas of Cyrene
