= Philippides of Paiania =

4th-century BC Athenian oligarch

Philippides, son of Philomelos, of Paiania was an Athenian aristocratic oligarch.

He is identified with the Philippides prosecuted by Hypereides in 336/5 B.C. who proposed honours for Macedonians after the Battle of Chaeronea, among them Alexander the Great. The trial speech by Hypereides against Philippides lasted just over thirty minutes and is taken from the papyrus where epilogue is preserved in its entirety. It states that Philippides campaigned with King Philip II of Macedon, which was his most serious offense, and did everything in the service of the Macedonians which Hypereides detested. Philippides was known as saying, "We must honor Alexander for all those that died at his hand". Hypereides attacks Philip and Alexander during the first half of the speech, the second half he turns his attack on Philippides. A reference suggest that Philip was alive at the time of the trial. Philippides was also involved in embassies to King Cassander.

In 294/3 B.C. Stratocles moved a decree in honour of Philippides, who had been active under the late government. In Olympiodoros' second year as eponymous archon, the archon basileus was Philippides of Paiania, a wealthy elder statesman of nobility. He took part in the established Athenian coalition government with military leader Olympiodoros and pro-Macedonian democrat Stratocles. Philippides of Paiania was one of the richest Athenians in the age of Lycurgus of Athens. In 293/2 B.C., Philippides was honoured with a gold crown for his excellence in the interests of the people, and as king.
