= Antander =

Antander (Greek: Ἄντανδρος - or Andro as he is called by the historian Orosius) was a man of Syracuse, Magna Graecia, of the 3rd and 4th centuries BCE. He was the older brother of Agathocles, king of Syracuse, and was a commander -- or strategos -- of the troops sent by the Syracusans to the relief of Crotona when it was besieged by the Bruttii tribe in 317.

== Siege of Syracuse ==
In the late 4th century, Sicily was invaded by Carthage and Syracuse itself was besieged by the Carthaginians. In 310, Agathocles hatched a daring plan to sneak out of Sicily with a sizable force to invade Libya, to draw the Carthaginians out of Sicily, leaving Antander together with Erymnon in command of Syracuse. During the absence of Agathocles in Africa, the Carthaginians under Hamilcar pressed their siege.

Some ancient sources report that Antander wished to surrender to Hamilcar after receiving news that Agathocles's fleet had been burned and that Erymnon persuaded him not to. More recent scholarship indicates that Hamilcar tried a ruse to convince Antander his brother's army had been destroyed by showing Antander the charred remains of his brother's boats, while in reality, Agathocles had burned his own ships as a tactic to move to a land assault. A debate erupted in the Syracusan assembly in which a man named Diognetus (or Phalaeneus), proposed surrendering to the Carthaginians, and Antander had the man arrested to prevent the spread of the idea to the besieged Syracusans. In any case, Syracuse survived the siege.

== Executions ==
Antander is mentioned afterwards as the instrument of his brother's cruelty: in 307, Agathocles commanded Antander to execute the families of all the rebellious Syracusan soldiers who remained in Africa (whom Agathocles blamed for the death of his sons), and Antander is said to have ruthlessly carried out this order, slaughtering men, women, children, and the elderly. Even more horrifying to the ancient mind, Antander's forces piled these bodies on the beach for the waves to take, denying them burial rites.

During Agathocles's absence from Syracuse, silver tetradrachms (previously issued under Agathocles's name only) were issued with Antander's monogram. Antander was also the author of a historical work - an apologetic biography of his brother Agathocles - which is quoted by the ancient historian Diodorus Siculus.

It is not known how long Antander lived, only that he outlived his brother Agathocles, who died in 289.
