= Antigone of Epirus =

Macedonian Queen and member of Ptolemaic dynasty

Antigone (Greek: Ἀντιγόνη, born before 317 BC–295 BC) was a Macedonian Greek noblewoman. Through her mother's second marriage she was a member of the Ptolemaic dynasty and through her marriage to Pyrrhus she was queen of Epirus.

Antigone was the daughter and the second child of Berenice, a noblewoman from Eordeaea, and her first husband Philip. She had an elder brother called Magas and a younger sister called Theoxena. Berenice's mother was the niece of the powerful regent Antipater and was related to members of the Argead dynasty.

Antigone's father, Philip, was the son of Amyntas by a mother whose name is unknown. Based on Plutarch (Pyrrhus 4.4), her father was previously married and had children, including daughters. He served as a military officer in the service of the Macedonian King Alexander the Great and commanded one of the Phalanx divisions in Alexander's wars.

About 318 BC, Antigone's father died of natural causes. After Philip's death, Antigone's mother took her and her siblings to Egypt where they were a part of the entourage of her mother's cousin Eurydice. Eurydice was then the wife of Ptolemy I Soter, the first ruler and founder of the Ptolemaic dynasty.

By 317 BC, Ptolemy I had fallen in love with Berenice and divorced Eurydice to marry her. Through her mother's marriage to Ptolemy I, Antigone was a stepdaughter to Ptolemy I and lived in her stepfather's court. Her mother bore Ptolemy I three children: two daughters, Arsinoe II, Philotera and the future Pharaoh Ptolemy II Philadelphus.

In 300 BC or 299 BC, Pyrrhus of Epirus was sent as a hostage to Egypt by Demetrius I of Macedon as part of a short-lived rapprochement between Demetrius I and Ptolemy I. In 299 BC/298 BC, Ptolemy I arranged for Pyrrhus to marry Antigone.

Pyrrhus obtained a fleet of ships and funding from Ptolemy I and set sail with Antigone for his kingdom in Epirus. Pyrrhus came into an agreement with his relative Neoptolemus II of Epirus, who had usurped the kingdom, to jointly rule Epirus.

Antigone bore Pyrrhus two children: a daughter called Olympias and a son called Ptolemy. Antigone possibly died in childbirth, as she seems to have died the same year as her son was born.

As a posthumous honour to his first wife, Pyrrhus founded a colony called Antigonia, which he named after her.

== Sources ==
- G. Crabb, Universal historical dictionary: or explanation of the names of persons and places in the departments of biblical, political and eccles. history, mythology, heraldry, biography, bibliography, geography, and numismatics, Volume 1 (Google eBook), Baldwin and Cradock, 1833
- W. Heckel, Who's who in the age of Alexander the Great: prosopography of Alexander's empire, Wiley-Blackwell, 2006
- J. Ussher, The Annals of the World, New Leaf Publishing Group, 2007
- Ptolemaic Genealogy: Antigone
- Ptolemaic Genealogy: Berenice I
- Ptolemaic Dynasty - Affiliated Lines: The Antipatrids
- Ancient Library article: Magas no.1^{[usurped]}
- Ancient Library article: Philippus no. 5
- Berenice I article at Livius.org
- Pyrrhus of Epirus Part 1 at Livius.org
