= Demochares =

4th/3rd century BCE Athenian orator and statesman

Demochares (Ancient Greek: Δημοχάρης; fl. 322 – c. 275 BC), nephew of Demosthenes, Athenian orator and statesman, was one of the few distinguished Athenians in the period of decline.

== Biography ==
Demochares is first heard of in 322 BC, when he spoke in vain against the surrender of Demosthenes and the other anti-Macedonian orators demanded by Antipater. During the next fifteen years, he probably lived in exile. On the restoration of the democracy by Demetrius Poliorcetes in 307 BC, he occupied a prominent position, but was banished in 303 BC for having ridiculed the decree of Stratocles, which contained a fulsome eulogy of Demetrius.

Demochares was recalled in 298 BC, and during the next four years he fortified and equipped the city with provisions and ammunition. In 296 or 295 BC, he was again banished for having concluded an alliance with the Boeotians, and did not return until 287 or 286 BC. In 280 BC, he induced the Athenians to erect a public monument in honour of his uncle with a suitable inscription. After his death (some five years later), Laches, the son of Demochares proposed and obtained a decree that a statue should be erected in his honour, containing a record of his public services, which seem to have consisted in a reduction of public expenses, a more prudent management of the state finances (after his return in 287 BC) and successful begging missions to the rulers of Egypt and Macedon.

Although a friend of the Stoic Zeno, Demochares regarded all other philosophers as the enemies of freedom, and in 306 BC supported the proposal of one Sophocles, advocating their expulsion from Attica. According to Cicero Demochares was the author of a history of his own times, written in an oratorical rather than a historical style. As a speaker he was noted for his freedom of language (Parrhesiastes). He was violently attacked by Timaeus, but found a strenuous defender in Polybius. See also Plutarch, Demosthenes, Demetrius, Vitae decem oratorum; Johann Droysen's essay on Demochares in Zeitschrift fur die Altertumswissenschaft (1836), Nos. 20, 21.
