= Olympiodorus (military leader) =

5th-century BC Athenian military commander

Portrait of Olympiodoros in bronze dated to 280 B.C. Oslo National Museum item no. 1292.

Olympiodoros (Ancient Greek: Ὀλυμπιόδωρος) was a military leader (General) in Athens in ancient Greece. His capacity as a savior of Athens and his self-confident power and serious engagement during political crises were emphasized. He was elected Strategos. He took part in the established Athenian coalition government with Philippides of Paiania. He commanded a body of three hundred picked men at the Battle of Plataea, who were engaged in a service from which all the other Greeks shrank. He was an Athenian general who, when Athens was attacked by Cassander, compelled the latter to withdraw his forces. He subsequently rid the city of the Macedonian garrison Demetrius had stationed there, and successfully defended Athens against Demetrius himself.
