= Agathocles of Syracuse =

Greek tyrant of Syracuse from 317 to 289 BC

Agathocles
- King of Syracuse
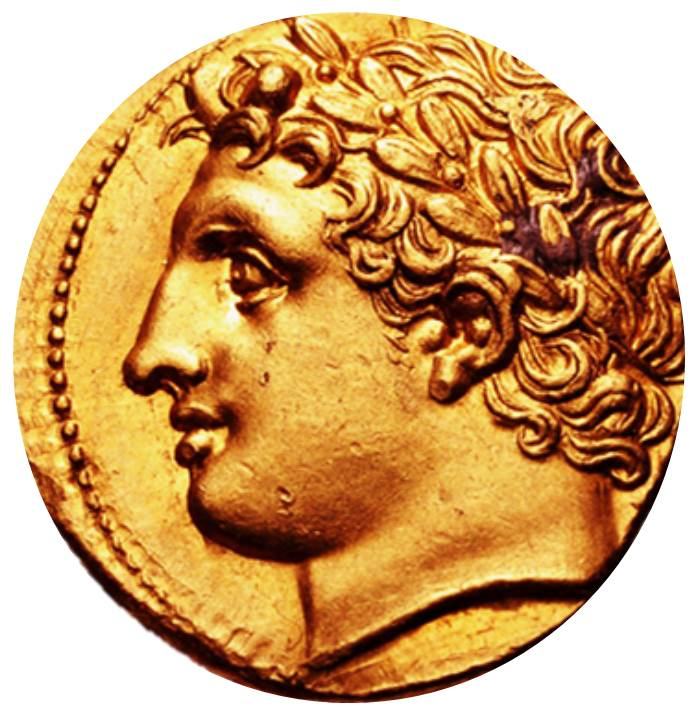
- Decadrachm of Agathocles depicting laureate bust of Apollo

Tyrant of Syracuse
- Reign: 317–289 BC
- Predecessor: Timoleon
- Successor: Hicetas

King of Syracuse
- Reign: c. 304-289 BC
- Predecessor: Position established
- Successor: Position abolished
- Born: 361 BC; Himera
- Died: 289 BC; Syracuse
- Consort: Theoxena
- Issue: With first wife: Archagathus; Heracleides; With Alcia?: Lanassa; Agathocles II; With Theoxena: Archagathus; Theoxena
- Greek: Ἀγαθοκλῆς
- Father: Carcinus of Rhegium
- Religion: Greek Polytheism

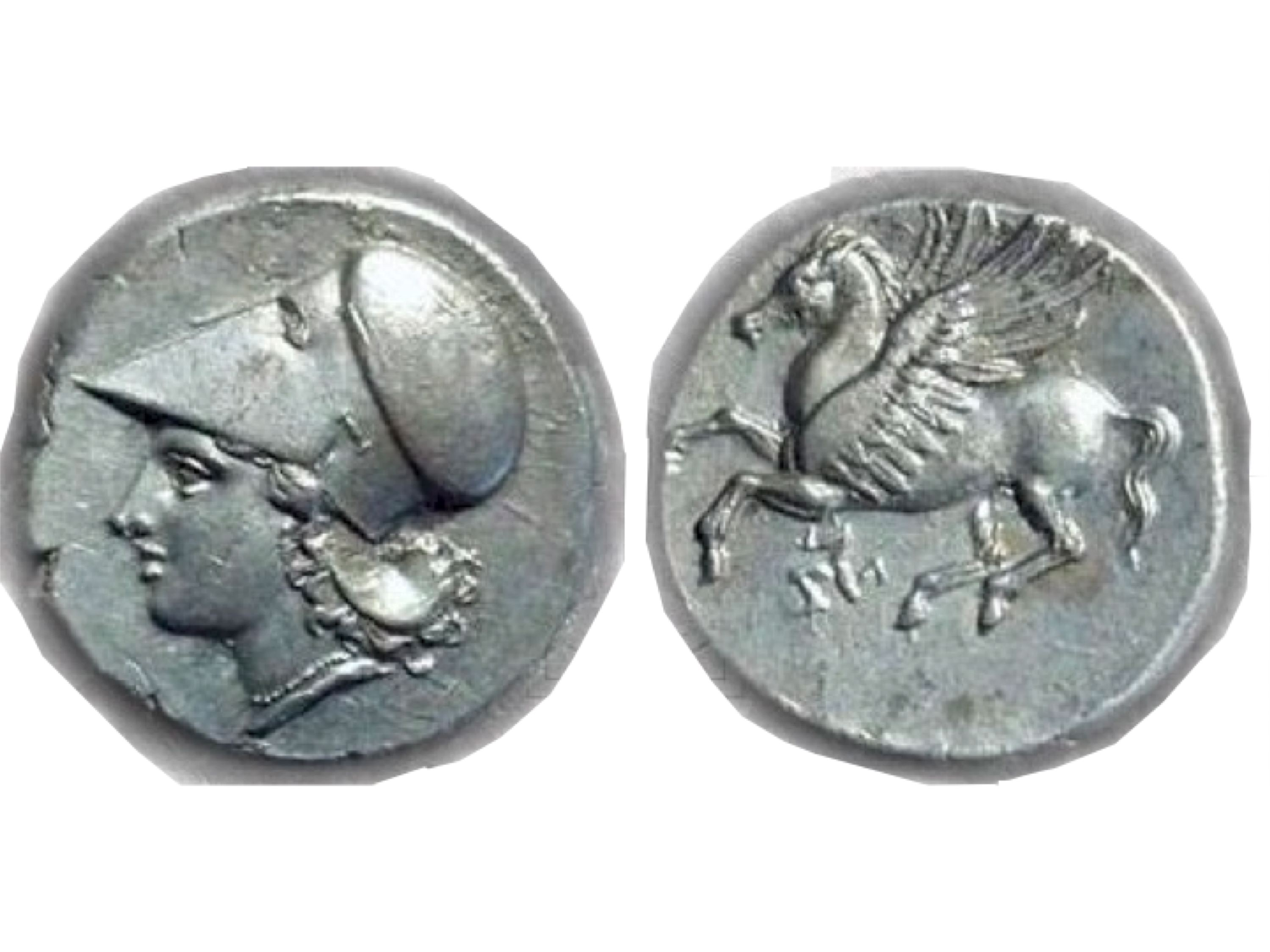
Silver stater of Agathocles, depicting Athena and Pegasus with the triskeles.

Agathocles (Ancient Greek: Ἀγαθοκλῆς, Agathoklḗs; 361–289 BC) was a tyrant of Syracuse from 317 BC and king of much of Sicily from 304 BC until his death. Agathocles began his career as a military officer, and raised his profile as a supporter of the democratic faction in Syracuse against the oligarchy of The Six Hundred. His opponents forced him into exile and he became a mercenary leader. He eventually made his way back to Syracuse and was elected as a general. A few years later, he took control through a coup d'état as tyrant of the city.

Agathocles had led a long, costly war against the Carthaginians, who ruled the western half of Sicily, between 311 and 306 BC. In a military campaign he led the invasion of Carthage's North African heartland in 310 BC. After initial successes he abandoned his army in Africa and returned to Sicily in 307 BC, where he made peace with the Carthaginians and restored the status quo ante bellum. He then assumed the royal title and managed to bring almost the entire Greek portion of Sicily, and part of Calabria, under his control. Agathocles came close to bringing the entirety of Magna Graecia under his control but his attempt to establish a dynasty fell apart as a result of conflict within his family.

== Biography ==
Agathocles was a son of Carcinus, who came from Rhegium. Carcinus was expelled from his hometown, so he migrated to Thermae Himeraeae and married a local citizen woman. Thermae, which was located on the north coast of Sicily, belonged to the western part of the island, which was under Carthaginian control. The couple had two sons, Antander and Agathocles. In 343 BC, when Agathocles was around eighteen years old, the family re-settled in Syracuse. Carcinus had answered a call from the commander Timoleon, which had overthrown the tyrannical regime of Dionysius II. Timoleon sought new citizens for the city, which had been depopulated by the civil wars. Thus, Carcinus and Agathocles acquired Syracusan citizenship. According to the sources, Carcinus was a potter and Agathocles followed him in his profession. Modern historians generally argue that he must have been a wealthy man who owned a pottery workshop. In later times, Agathocles frequently advertised his lower class origins and used them as part of his self-presentation as a ruler, since performative modesty and presenting himself as a man of the people would be important parts of his persona.

Agathocles began his military career during Timoleon's rule. He initially served as a soldier and then as an officer. Later, after Timoleon's death in 337 BC, Agathocles participated in an expedition against Acragas and began a relationship with the general, Damas, who promoted him to chiliarch. After Damas' death, Agathocles married his widow. This made him one of the richest men in Syracuse, which gave him a good platform to begin his political ascent.

After Timoleon's death, Syracuse descended into the traditional conflict between democrats and oligarchs. The oligarchs had the upper hand and ruled the city as a club, called "the Six Hundred". Agathocles' elder brother, Antander, was elected to a generalship, during this period, so he must have had good relationships with members of the ruling circle. Agathocles, on the other hand, spoke in the people's assembly and placed himself on the side of the opposition democrats, but he was unable to overcome their power. After a successful campaign to defend Croton in southern Italy from the Bruttii, he denied an award for bravery which he felt he had earnt. After this, he openly opposed the government and openly accused the leading oligarchs, Sosistratus and Heracleides, of seeking to become tyrants. These accusations were not successful and the two oligarchs solidified their power. Agathocles' situation in Syracuse was then untenable and he declared that he was compelled to leave the city. This does not necessarily mean that he was formally exiled.

=== Double exile ===
Agathocles went to southern Italy, where he led the life of a mercenary captain. At the same time, he built up an independent power base, as preparation for a return to Syracuse. His first military effort was a failure, however: he attempted to bring the major city of Croton in Calabria under his control by force, probably in alliance with the local democrats, but he was completely defeated and had to flee with his surviving followers to Tarentum. The Tarentines accepted him into their mercenary forces, but they distrusted him because of his ambition and plots, which led to his dismissal. After this, he gathered together democrats who had been expelled from their cities by local oligarchs. An opportunity appeared at Rhegium, the hometown of Agathocles' father. There, the democrats were in power, but the city was attacked by forces led by the Syracusan oligarchs, who wanted to help the local oligarchs take power by force. Agathocles defeated this Syracusan expeditionary force, which destabilised Sosistratus and Heracleides' position in Syracuse and as a result they were overthrown in a coup. The democrats returned to power and drove the leading oligarchs out of Syracuse. The exiled oligarchs allied themselves with the Carthaginians. These developments allowed Agathocles to return home around 322 BC.

Agathocles distinguished himself in the subsequent battles against the Carthaginians and oligarchs, but did not manage to acquire a leading position in the city. Instead, the Syracusans chose to request a commander from their mother city, Corinth, in accordance with a law established by Timoleon. The Corinthians sent one Acestorides, who organised an amnesty for the oligarchs, made peace with the Carthaginians, and exiled Agathocles. The radical democrats were forced out and a moderate oligarchy was established. Acestorides even attempted to have Agathocles assassinated. Agathocles established a private army, apparently funded from his own assets. He took advantage of the fact that the Syracusans were considered oppressive by other cities in Sicily and successfully presented himself as a supporter of these cities' interests against the Syracusans. He managed to take over Leontini and even led an attack on Syracuse. The situation became so tenuous for the oligarchs in Syracuse that they reached out to the Carthaginians for help.

Agathocles outpaced the oligarchs. He negotiated with the Carthaginian commander in Sicily, Hamilcar, and convinced him to withdraw. Allegedly, they had concluded a personal agreement to support each other in establishing themselves as sole rulers of their respective cities. After the loss of Carthaginian support, Syracuse was isolated. The citizens, who did not really wish to fight for oligarchy, agreed to allow Agathocles to return home. He swore the Syracuse "great oath", promising that he would not establish a tyranny. After that, he was elected commander in chief of the Syracusan army in 319/318 BC.

=== Seizure of power ===
The position of Agathocles within the city of Syracuse was initially that of a regular military commander, with wide but limited powers. His title was General and Guardian of the Peace (στρατηγὸς καὶ φύλαξ τῆς εἰρήνης, strategos kai phylax tes eirenes). In Syracuse, the surviving oligarchs banded together as "The Six Hundred" and continued to oppose him. Agathocles took advantage of the conflicts between the Syracusans and the non-Greek Sicels and between the rich and poor within Syracuse to overcome these opponents. On the pretext of taking military action against external enemies, he was able to gather a powerful force, which was loyal only to him, without raising suspicion.

In 317 BC, Agathocles used this force to launch a coup. At a meeting that the leading members of the opposition party had been invited to, he had most of the leading men of the oligarchy massacred on the spot. His trumpeters gave the sign for battle and a general slaughter took place in the city, in which the wealthy and their supporters were the main victims. Their houses were plundered. According to Diodorus Siculus's account, over 4,000 people were killed, purely because they belonged to the upper class. More than 6,000 people escaped from the city, even though the gates had been locked. They mostly fled to Agrigentum.

Finally, Agathocles called an assembly of the people, in which he presented himself as a saviour of democracy in the face of the oligarchs and announced that he would retire from his position and return to private life. His followers responded by calling on him to take over the leadership of the state. He responded that he was willing to be general once more, but only if he could hold the role without any colleagues, as General with unlimited power (στρατηγὸς αὐτοκράτωρ, strategós autokrátor). This was the title that the earlier ruler Dionysius I had used as the legal basis for his tyranny. The people elected him to this position and also entrusted him with a general "management of the city" (ἐπιμέλεια τῆς πόλεως, epiméleia tes póleos). After this he announced a cancellation of debts and redistribution of the land, two planks of the traditional populist programme.

=== Military expansion ===
The sphere of Agathocles' operations in southern Italy and Sicily

Agathocles first occupied himself with the subjugation of hostile cities in the Greek part of Sicily. The centres of opposition to him were Acragas, Gela, and Messina. Many of the Syracusan exiles who had supported the oligarchy were found in these three cities, which joined together in an alliance at the prompting of Acragas. The Acragantines recruited a Spartan prince called Acrotatus to serve as the commander in chief of the alliance, since they were afraid that a Sicilian leader might use the position to establish himself as a tyrant. However, Acrotatus did not prove successful, provoking conflict among his own forces and then fleeing. On the other hand, the Syracusans were unsuccessful in their efforts to seize Messina. Neither side was able to achieve a decisive victory. Since the Carthaginians saw Syracusan expansionism as a threat, they supported Messina. The Carthaginian commander Hamilcar brokered a peace in 314/313 BC, which guaranteed the autonomy of the Greek cities of Sicily (outside the Carthaginian sphere), but gave the Syracusans a position of hegemony over them. The recognition of Syracuse's claim to hegemony was a significant win for Agathocles. In Carthage, Hamilcar faced fierce criticism for making this concession.

Agathocles used the hegemony clause in this treaty to expand his power. The Carthaginians did not have a sufficient force stationed in Sicily to prevent him from doing this. He quickly brought many cities and fortresses under his control. In 313/2 BC, his supporters in Messina overcame the oligarchs, allowing him to take the city without a fight. The city of Tauromenium on the east coast also fell into his hands. He killed all of his oppenents. Finally, he turned against Agrigentum.

=== Rulership ===
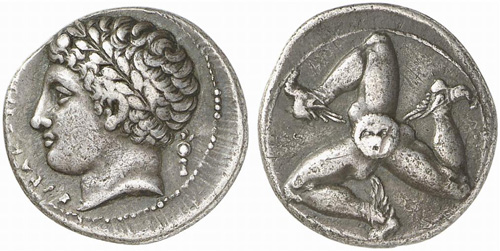
Silver drachma of Agathocles, depicting Apollo and the triskeles

War with Carthage followed. In 311 BC Agathocles was defeated in the Battle of the Himera River and besieged in Syracuse. In 310 BC he made a desperate effort to break through the blockade and attack Carthage. He landed at Cape Bon in August 310 BC, and was able to defeat the Carthaginians for the first time, and establish a camp near Tunis. He then turned east and tried to take over coastal trading cities such as Neapolis and Hadrumetum, and on this occasion concluded an alliance with Ailymas, king of the Libyans according to Diodorus of Sicily, in an attempt to surround and isolate Carthage. After capturing Hadrumetum, Thapsus and other coastal towns, Agathocles turned his attention to central Tunisia. Before or during this campaign, he broke his alliance with Ailymas, whom he pursued and killed, but he kept his Numidian army, including war chariots they built.

In 309 BCE, Agathocles began trying to sway Ophellas, ruler of Cyrenaica, as he was likely to prove a useful ally in Agathocles' war against the Carthaginians. To gain his allegiance, he promised to cede to Ophellas whatever conquests their combined forces might make in Africa, reserving to himself only the possession of Sicily. Ophellas gathered a powerful army from the homeland of his wife Euthydike (a descendant of Miltiades), Athens, where many citizens felt disgruntled after having lost their voting rights. Despite the natural obstacles that presented themselves on his route, Ophellas succeeded in reaching the Carthaginian territories after a toilsome and perilous march of more than two months. He was received by Agathocles with every demonstration of friendship, and the two armies encamped near each other, but a few days later, Agathocles betrayed his new ally by attacking the camp of the Cyrenaeans and having Ophellas killed. The Cyrenean troops, left without a leader, went over to Agathocles.

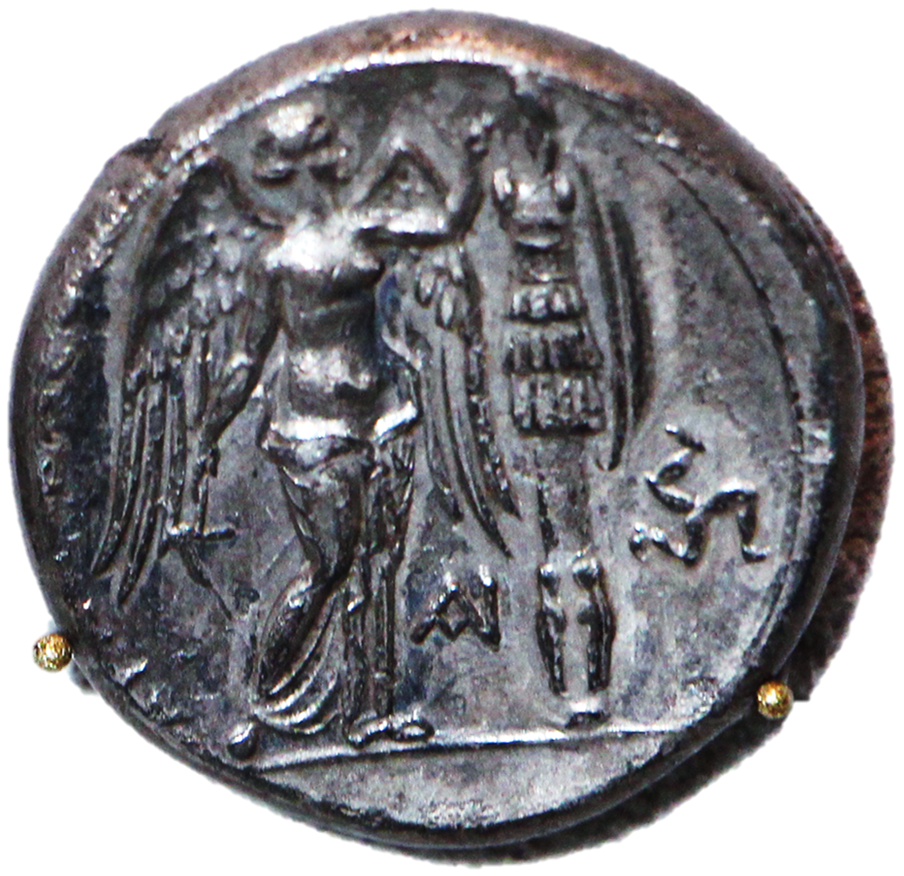
Silver tetradrachm of Agathocles, depicting Nike nailing up a war trophy

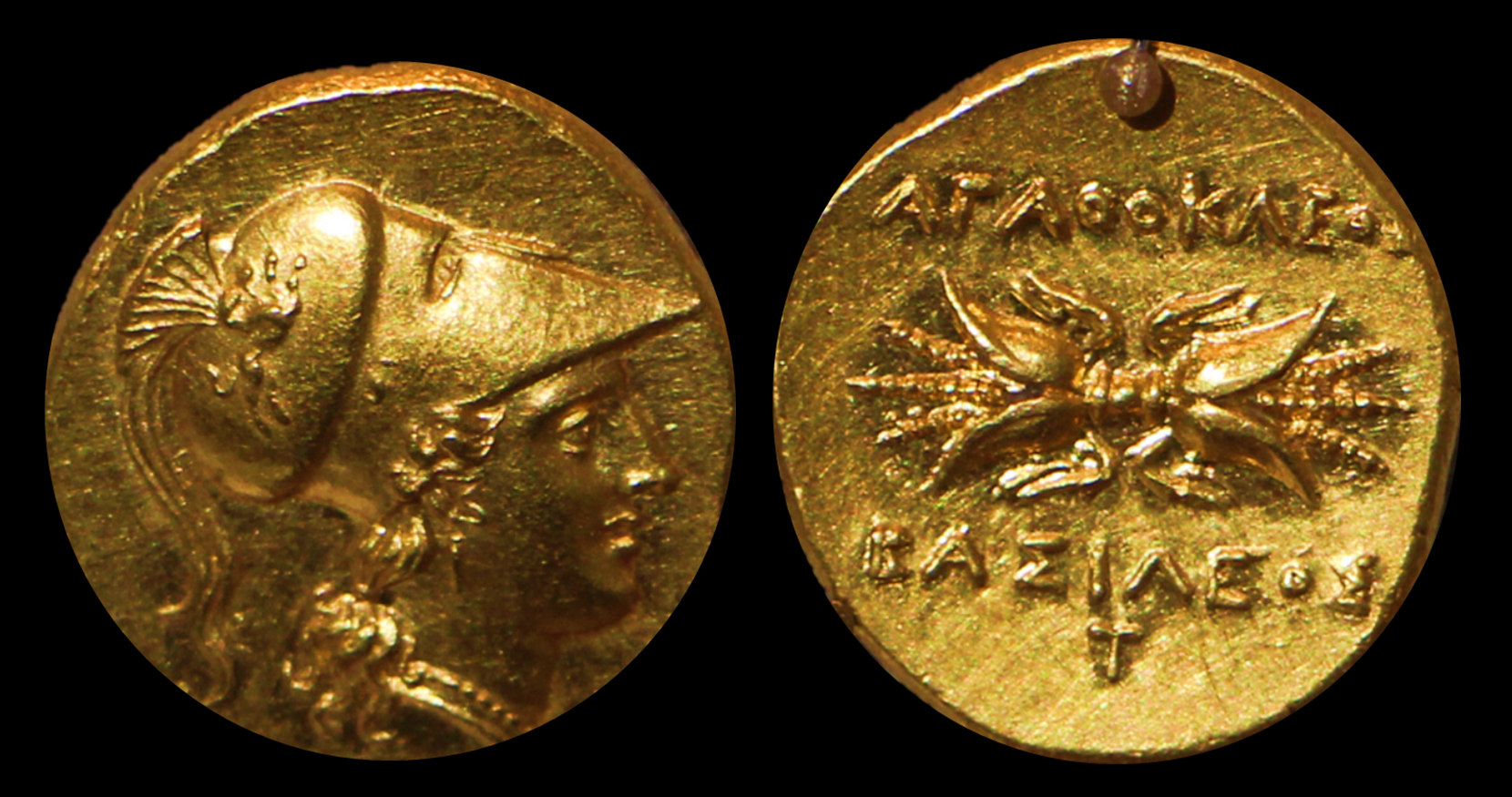
Gold coin of Agathocles, depicting Athena on the obverse and a thunderbolt on the reverse. The Doric Greek inscription reads: ΑΓΑΘΟΚΛΕΟΥΣ ΒΑΣΙΛΕOΣ, "Of King Agathocles".

After several victories, he was finally completely defeated (307 BC) and fled secretly to Sicily. After concluding peace with Carthage in 306 BC, Agathocles styled himself king of Sicily in 304 BC, and established his rule over the Greek cities of the island more firmly than ever. A peace treaty with Carthage left him in control of Sicily east of the Halycus River. Even in his old age, he displayed the same restless energy and is said to have been contemplating a fresh attack on Carthage at the time of his death.

His last years were plagued by ill health and the attempted usurpation of his throne by his grandson Archagathus, who Diodorus Siculus states had him poisoned; however Justinius and the majority of modern historians assert he died a natural death (presumably from cancer of the jaw). He was a born leader of mercenaries, and he did not shrink from cruelty for the purposes to royal power. Agathocles restored the Syracusan democracy on his deathbed and did not want his grandson to succeed him as king.

== Family ==
Agathocles was married three times. His first wife was the widow of his patron Damas, by whom he had two sons:

- Archagathus, who was murdered by the army in Africa in 307 BC after Agathocles had abandoned it. He had one son, also called Archagathus, who was Agathocles' main general and heir in the 290s BC, but became involved in a succession dispute with his younger uncle, also called Agathocles, and was assassinated immediately after his father's death in 289 BC.
- Heracleides, who was murdered with his brother in Africa in 307 BC.

Agathocles' second wife was Alcia, with whom he had two children:

- Lanassa, second wife of King Pyrrhus of Epirus and mother of Alexander II of Epirus.
- Agathocles, who was murdered in a succession dispute shortly before his father's death.

Agathocles' third wife was Theoxena, who was the second daughter of Berenice I and her first husband Philip and thus a stepdaughter of Ptolemy I Soter, king of Egypt. She escaped to Egypt with their two children following Agathocles' death in 289 BC:

- Archagathus and Theoxena, who escaped to Egypt in 289 BC. Their descendants included Agathocleia and Agathocles of Egypt, who were Ptolemy IV's chief mistress and chief minister respectively, and dominated Egypt in the first years of Ptolemy V's reign.

== Legacy ==
Agathocles was cited as an example "Of Those Who Have Attained A Principality Through Crimes" in chapter 8 of Niccolò Machiavelli's treatise on politics, The Prince (1513).

He was described as behaving as a criminal at every stage of his career. Machiavelli claimed:

Agathocles, the Sicilian, became King of Syracuse not only from a private but from a low and abject position. This man, the son of a potter, through all the changes in his fortunes, always led an infamous life. Nevertheless, he accompanied his infamies with so much ability of mind and body that, having devoted himself to the military profession, he rose through its ranks to be Praetor of Syracuse.

Machiavelli goes on to reason that Agathocles' success, in contrast to other criminal tyrants, was due to his ability to commit his crimes quickly and ruthlessly, and states that cruelties are best used when they are done "at a stroke" out of the necessity to secure a prince's rule.

The exact role Agathocles plays in Machiavelli's works is of some debate amongst scholars, with some even asserting that Machiavelli is purposefully being ironic about Agathocles' immorality allegedly hindering his reputation.

== Family tree of Agathocles ==
Magas | Antigone of Macedon
Carcinus of Rhegium | Philip | Berenice I | Ptolemy I king of Egypt
1.(unknown) | Agathocles I tyrant of Syracuse, king of Sicily | 3.Theoxena Elder | Ptolemy II king of Egypt
2.Alcia
Archagathus Elder general ∞ Theoxena | Heracleides military officer | Agathocles II | Lanassa | Pyrrhus I king of Epirus | Antigone | Archagathus of Libya epistates of Cyrenaica ∞ Oenanthe | Theoxena Younger | Ptolemy III king of Egypt
Archagathus Younger military officer | Agathocles Elder ∞ Oenanthe | Ptolemy IV king of Egypt
Agathoclea | Agathocles Younger | Ptolemy V king of Egypt

== Primary sources ==
- Diodorus Siculus Library of History Books 19–21.
- Justin, Epitome of Pompeius Trogus Book 22.
- Polyaenus 5.3
- Polybius 9.23

== Bibliography ==
- Agostinetti, Anna Simonetti (2008). "Agatocle di Siracusa: un tiranno-operaio" [Agathocles of Syracuse: a tyrant-worker]. Aristonothos. 2: 153–160.
- Bennett, Chris (2012). "Ptolemaic Dynasty Affiliates". www.instonebrewer.com.
- Berve, Helmut (1953). Die Herrschaft des Agathokles [The reign of Agathocles]. Munich: Bayerischen Akademie der Wissenschaften.
- Consolo Langher, Sebastiana Nerina (2000). Agatocle: da capoparte a monarca fondatore di un regno tra Cartagine e i Diadochi [Agathocles: from political leader to founding monarch of a kingdom between Carthage and the Diadochi]. Messina: Di.Sc.A.M. ISBN 978-88-8268-004-6.
- Habicht, Christian (1997). Athens from Alexander to Antony. Cambridge, MA: Harvard University Press. ISBN 9780674051119.
- Huß, Werner (1985), Geschichte der Karthager (in German), Munich: C.H. Beck, ISBN 9783406306549
- Lehmler, Caroline (2005). Syrakus unter Agathokles und Hieron II. Die Verbindung von Kultur und Macht in einer hellenistischen Metropole [Syracuse under Agathocles and Hiero II. The combination of culture and power in a Hellenistic metropolis]. Frankfurt: Verlag Antike. ISBN 978-3-938032-07-7.
- Meister, Klaus (1984). "Agathocles". In Walbank, F. W.; Astin, A. E.; Frederiksen, M. W.; Ogilvie, R. M. (eds.). The Cambridge Ancient History: Volume 7 Part 1. The Hellenistic World (2nd ed.). Cambridge: Cambridge University Press. pp. 384–411.
- Meister, Klaus (1991). "Agatocle in Diodoro: interpretazione e valutazione nella storiografia moderna" [Agathocles in Diodorus: interpretation and evaluation in modern historiography]. In Galvagno, Emilio; Molè Ventura, Concetta (eds.). Mito, storia, tradizione. Catania. pp. 187–199.

| Preceded by: oligarchy position previously held by Timoleon in 337 BC | Tyrant of Syracuse; 317 BC – 289 BC | Succeeded by: Hicetas |
