= Heracleides (307 BC) =

Son of Agathocles the tyrant of Syracuse

Heracleides (Ancient Greek: Ἡρακλείδης), son of Agathocles of Syracuse, was a man of ancient Syracuse, Magna Graecia, in the 4th century BCE. He accompanied his father on his memorable expedition to Africa, and appears to have been regarded by him with especial favor, as when Agathocles, at length despairing of success in Africa, and unable to carry off his army, determined to secure his own safety by secret flight, he selected Heracleides for his companion, leaving his eldest son, Archagathus, to his fate. The latter, however, obtained information of his intention, and communicated it to the soldiery, who thereupon arrested both Agathocles and Heracleides: but they were afterwards induced to set the tyrant himself at liberty, of which he immediately availed himself to make his escape to Sicily, and the soldiers, enraged at his desertion, put to death both Heracleides and Archagathus in 307 BCE.
