= Stratocles =

Athenian politician

Stratocles son of Euthydemos of Diomeia (Greek: Στρατοκλῆς Εὐθυδήμου Διομεεὺς), was an Athenian politician during the third and fourth centuries BCE. He was a member of a family from the deme of Diomeia.

He is credited with being one of the most prolific proposers of surviving inscribed (epigraphical) decrees in Athenian history (around 26 surviving decrees).

At some time, he compiled the existing information on knowledge of tactics made in the age of Homer. In 293 BC, the Macedonian king Demetrius I established a coalition government under oligarchic forms of which Stratocles, aristocratic archon Philippides of Paiania and military leader Olympiodoros took part. Stratocles moved a decree in honour of Philippides of Paiania in 294/3 BC.
