= Archagathus (son of Agathocles of Syracuse) =

4th-century Syracusan Greek

Archagathus (Ancient Greek: Ἀρχάγαθος; fl. 4th century BC, died 307 BC) was a Syracusan Greek Prince of Magna Graecia.

Archagathus was a son of Agathocles of Syracuse and had a brother named Heracleides. His father was the Greek tyrant of Syracuse who later became King of Sicily. His mother was the widow of his father's late patron, Damas.

He accompanied his father in an expedition to Carthage in 310 BC. Archagathus narrowly escaped being put to death in a tumult of soldiers, an event precipitated by him having murdered a man named Lyciscus, who reproached him in committing incest with his step-mother Alcia, the mother of his paternal half-sister, Lanassa. When his father was summoned from Carthage to return to state affairs in Sicily, Archagathus was left by his father to be in command of their army.

Initially, Archagathus had several successful military victories. Later, he and his army were defeated three times and were obliged to take refuge in Tunis. His father returned to assist him but the mutiny of the Syracusan soldiers forced Agathocles to leave Carthage. Archagathus was murdered by soldiers of Syracuse in their revenge. He had a son, also named Archagathus by Theoxena, his third wife.

== Sources ==
- Ancient Library article: Archagathus, No. 1 & 2
- Ptolemaic Genealogy: Theoxena
- Ptolemaic Dynasty - Affiliated Lines: Agathocles
