= Archagathus (grandson of Agathocles of Syracuse) =

Archagathus (Ancient Greek: Ἀρχάγαθος, fl. 4th century BC) was a Syracusan Greek Prince of Magna Graecia. He was the son of Archagathus by a wife whose name is unknown, being a paternal grandson of the Greek tyrant (and later "king" of Sicily) Agathocles of Syracuse from his first wife.

Archagathus was described as a youth of great bravery and daring. After the death of his father in 307 BC, Archagathus murdered his paternal uncle Agathocles, so that he would succeed his paternal grandfather. After the death of his paternal uncle, he was in turn murdered by a local Greek citizen called Menon.

== Sources ==
- Ancient Library article: Archagathus, No. 1 & 2
