= Philotera =

Philotera (Greek: Φιλωτέρα, born 315/309 BC-probably after 282 BC and before 268 BC) was a Greek Macedonian noblewoman and a Greek Egyptian princess of the Ptolemaic dynasty.

Philotera was the daughter of Ptolemy I Soter and Berenice I of Egypt. She had one older sister, Arsinoe II, and a younger brother, the future Pharaoh Ptolemy II Philadelphus. From her parents' previous marriages, Philotera had various half-maternal and half-paternal siblings.

Little is known of her life. Philotera died sometime after the accession of Ptolemy II to the Ptolemaic throne and before Arsinoe II died. The fact that Philotera died before her sister did is demonstrated by a hymn written by Callimachus on the death of Arsinoe II.

After Philotera died, Ptolemy II deified her as a goddess. Ptolemy II erected a temple in her honor in Alexandria. Greeks and Egyptians worshipped her along with Arsinoe II, and Ptolemy II created a religious cult in her honour.

== City ==
Philotera (Φιλωτέρα) and Philoteris (Φιλωτερίς) was the ancient name of Safaga in Egypt. It was founded by Satyrus (Ancient Greek: Σάτυρος) and named in honor of the deceased sister of Ptolemy II Philadelphus.

== Sources ==
- Ptolemaic Genealogy: Arsinoe II
- Ptolemaic Genealogy: Berenice I
- Ptolemaic Genealogy: Philotera
- The Maritime Incense Route Nabataea: Philotera
