= Berenice I =

- Queen consort of Egypt
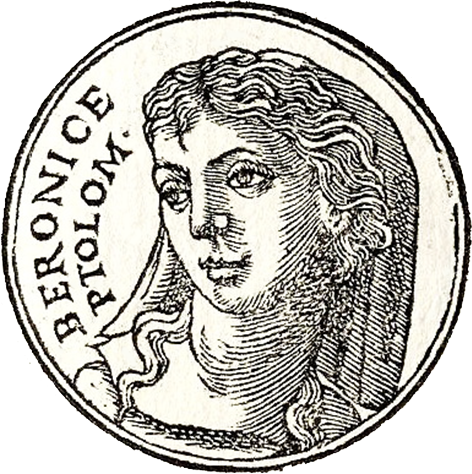
- Berenice I from Promptuarii Iconum Insigniorum
- Born: c. 340 BC; Macedonia
- Died: between 279 and 268 BC; Egypt
- Spouse: Philip, a Macedonian nobleman Ptolemy I Soter
- Issue: With Philip: Magas King of Cyrene; Antigone (later queen of Epirus); Theoxena; With Ptolemy I Soter: Arsinoe II; Philotera; Ptolemy II Philadelphus
- Dynasty: Ptolemaic
- Father: Magas
- Mother: Antigone

Berenice I (Ancient Greek: Βερενίκη; c. 340 BC – between 279 and 268 BC) was Queen of Egypt by marriage to Ptolemy I Soter. She became the second queen, after Eurydice, of the Ptolemaic dynasty of Egypt.

== Life ==
=== Family ===
Berenice was originally from Eordaea. She was the daughter of princess Antigone of Macedon, and an obscure local, a Macedonian nobleman called Magas. Her maternal grandfather was a nobleman called Cassander who was the brother of Antipater, the regent for Alexander's empire, and through her mother was a relation to his family.

=== First marriage ===
In 325 BC, Berenice married an obscure local nobleman and military officer called Philip. Philip was previously married and had other children.

Through her first marriage, she became the mother of King Magas of Cyrene, Antigone, who married King Pyrrhus of Epirus; and a daughter called Theoxena.

Magas dedicated an inscription to himself and his father, when he served as a priest of Apollo. Pyrrhus gave her name to a new city called Berenicis.

Philip died around 318 BC.

=== Queen of Egypt ===
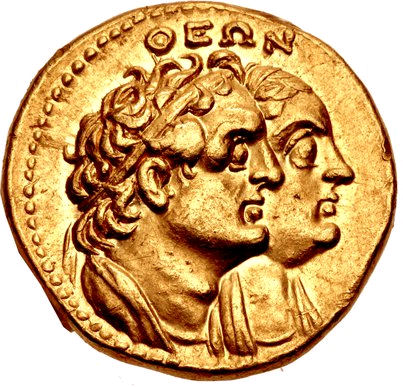
Berenice I with her second husband Ptolemy I Soter

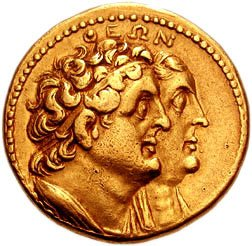
Portraits of Berenice I and Ptolemy I Soter on a golden octodrachm minted in Alexandria in c. 265 BC

After the death of her first husband, Berenice travelled to Egypt with her children as a lady-in-waiting for her mother's first cousin Eurydice who was the wife of Ptolemy I. Ptolemy I was one of the generals of King Alexander the Great and founder of the Ptolemaic dynasty of Ancient Egypt.

Berenice became involved in a relationship with Ptolemy I, who married her in 317 BC. Berenice became the mother of Arsinoe II, Philotera, and a son, Ptolemy II Philadelphus.

Her son Ptolemy II was recognized as his father's heir in preference to Eurydice's children to Ptolemy I.

During his reign, Ptolemy II built a port on the Red Sea and named it Berenice after his mother.

After she died, Ptolemy II and later Ptolemy IV Philopator decreed divine honors to her (Theocritus, Idylls xv. and xvii.).

== Issue ==
With her first spouse Philip, she became the mother of:

- King Magas of Cyrene
- Antigone, who married King Pyrrhus of Epirus
- Theoxena

With her second spouse Ptolemy I, she became the mother of:

- Arsinoe II, who married first Lysimachus, then her half-brother Ptolemy Keraunos and finally her full brother Ptolemy II.
- Philotera c.312-c.275 BC, deified.
- Ptolemy II Philadelphus, Pharaoh of Egypt.
