= Lanassa (wife of Pyrrhus) =

Queen consort of Epirus
- Reign: 295–291 BC

Queen consort of Macedon
- Reign: 291-? BC
- Spouse: Pyrrhus of Epirus; Demetrius I of Macedon
- Issue: Alexander II of Epirus
- Father: Agathocles of Syracuse
- Mother: Alcia

Lanassa (Greek: Λάνασσα) was a daughter of king Agathocles of Syracuse, Sicily, Magna Graecia, perhaps by his second wife Alcia. In 295 BC, Agathocles married Lanassa to King Pyrrhus of Epirus. Agathocles himself escorted his daughter with his fleet to Epirus to her groom. Lanassa brought the island of Corcyra as dowry into the marriage. The couple had one son, Alexander. However, Lanassa could not accept her husband's polygamous lifestyle, and so she left Pyrrhus in 291 BC, went to Corcyra, and offered this island as dowry to Demetrius I Poliorcetes, then king of Macedonia, if he would become her new husband. The courted diadoch came to Corcyra, married Lanassa, and occupied the island. After the death of Agathocles (289 BC) Pyrrhus, as former husband of Lanassa, asserted hereditary claims to Sicily. On the basis of these claims, the inhabitants of Syracuse asked Pyrrhus in 279 BC for assistance against Carthage.
