= Eurydice of Egypt =

Egyptian queen consort

Eurydice
- Queen consort of Egypt
- Spouse: Ptolemy I Soter
- Issue: Ptolemy Keraunos; Meleager; Ptolemais; Lysandra
- Dynasty: Ptolemaic
- Father: Antipater

Eurydice (Ancient Greek: Εὐρυδίκη) was the third known wife to Ptolemy I Soter and as such a queen of Egypt.

== Life ==
Eurydice (ca. 330–post 279 BCE) is thought to be the youngest of Antipater's known daughters. Her wedding date and repudiation date are a topic of debate as is the repudiation itself. Scholars have narrowed down the date between 322 and 319 BCE with van Oppen arguing for 319 BCE citing Antipater's rise in position from the Macedonian regent in Europe to a seat in the regency of the kings in late 320 BCE.

Four children are attributed to Eurydice with a possible unknown fifth: Ptolemy Ceraunus, Meleager, Ptolemais, and Lysandra. Ptolemy Ceraunus was expected to be his father's heir, but in 285/4 BCE Ptolemy I chose his youngest son Ptolemy II (whose mother was the fourth wife Berenice I, Eurydice's cousin) instead. Ptolemy Ceraunus and Meleager both consecutively ruled as king of Macedon for a short amount of time before being killed. Ptolemais married Demetrius I of Macedon and Lysandra was married to Alexander V followed by Agathocles.

As for the repudiation, "the scholarly discussion about Eurydice's alleged repudiation has been seriously hampered by the fallacy of Ptolemy's serial monogamy". There is much evidence to support the assertion that Ptolemy practiced royal polygamy. Pausanias confirms that Ptolemy fathered children by Eurydice and Berenice concurrently.

Eurydice's lineage ended with Demetrius the Fair (285–240/49 BCE) son of Demetrius Poliorcetes and Ptolemais.

== Issue ==
- Ptolemy Ceraunus, king of Macedon from 281 BC to 279 BC.
- Meleager, who ruled as King of Macedon during 279 BC for two months.
- A third son, possibly Argaeos or Meleager, whose name is unknown but is referred to as 'rebel in Cyprus', who was put to death by Ptolemy II Philadelphus. Argaeos is thought to be the child of Alexander III and Thais an Athenian courtesan who was later the first wife of Ptolemy I.
