= Arsinoe II =

Queen of the Ptolemaic Kingdom (c.316–c.270/268 BC)

Arsinoe II Philadelphos
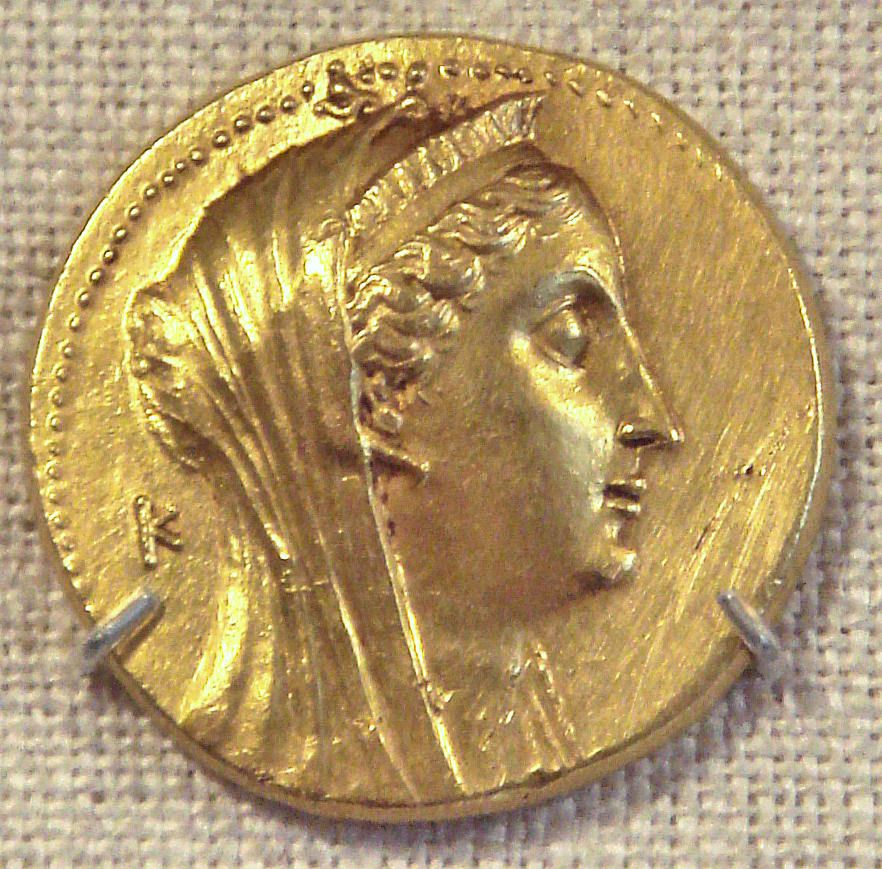

Queen consort of Egypt (Note: Arsinoe II did have titles of "King of Upper and Lower Egypt" and "female ruler" and thus is sometimes regarded as Pharaoh, but she was not recognized as sovereign in the Hellenistic administration of the country.)
- Tenure: 275 – 268 BC

Queen consort of Thrace and Macedon
- Tenure: 300/299 (Thrace) & 288 (Macedon) – 280/279 BC
- Kings: Lysimachus (until 281 BC); Ptolemy Keraunos (since 281 BC)
- Born: 316 BC
- Died: 270 or 268 BCE (aged c. 47)
- Spouse: Lysimachus; Ptolemy Keraunos; Ptolemy II Philadelphos
- Issue: Ptolemy Epigonos; Lysimachus (son of Lysimachus); Philip (son of Lysimachus)
- Dynasty: Ptolemaic
- Father: Ptolemy I Soter
- Mother: Berenice I of Egypt

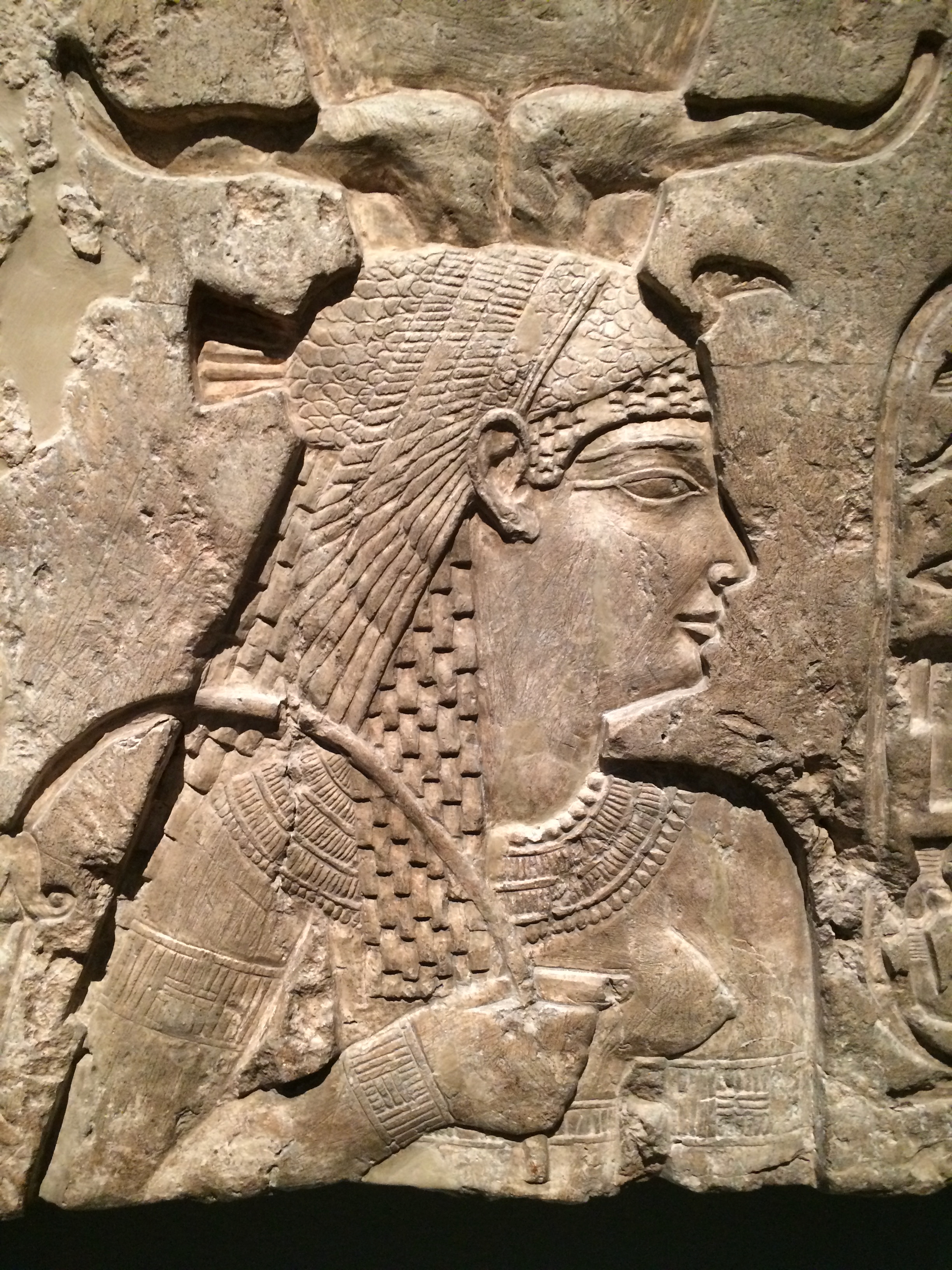
Arsinoe II. Getty Center collections, 2018

Arsinoë II (Koine Greek: Ἀρσινόη, c. 316 BC – 270 or 268 BC) was Queen consort of Thrace, Anatolia, and Macedonia by her first and second marriage, to king Lysimachus and king Ptolemy Keraunos respectively, and then Queen of the Ptolemaic Kingdom of Egypt by marriage to her brother, Pharaoh Ptolemy II Philadelphus. As an Egyptian queen she acquired the royal name Arsinoe Philadelphos, as well the title nswt-bjtj ("King of Upper and Lower Egypt") that may suggest she was co-ruler with her husband; the exact meaning of this elevation and whether it occurred during her life or posthumously is uncertain. After her death, Arsinoe was deified at the orders of her husband and the cult of Arsinoe Philadelphos became widespread in the Ptolemaic territories.

== Life ==
=== Early life ===
Arsinoë was the first daughter of Pharaoh Ptolemy I Soter, founder of the Hellenistic state of Egypt, and his second wife Berenice I of Egypt.

She may have been born in Memphis, but was raised in the new city of Alexandria, where her father moved his capital. Nothing is known of her childhood or education, but judging from her later life as patron of scholars and noted for her learning, she is estimated to have been given a high education. Her brothers were tutored by intellectuals hired by their fathers, and it is regarded likely that she attended these lessons as well: she corresponded with the intellectual Strato of Lampsacus later in life, and he may have previously been her tutor.

=== Queen of Lysimachus ===
Around the age of 15, Arsinoë married King Lysimachus, who was then around 60 years old. Together, the pair had three sons: Ptolemy Epigonos, Lysimachus, and Philip.

In order to position her sons for the throne, she had Lysimachus's first son, Agathocles, poisoned on account of treason.

Arsinoe reportedly paid for a rotunda in the Samothrace temple complex, where she was likely an initiate.

=== Queen of Ptolemy Keraunos ===
In 281 BC, Lysimachus died in battle and Arsinoë fled to Cassandreia (Κασσάνδρεια). There, she married her paternal half-brother Ptolemy Keraunos. Ptolemy Keraunos was a son of Ptolemy I Soter and his first wife, Eurydice of Egypt. The marriage was for political reasons: both claimed the throne of Macedonia and Thrace (by the time of his death Lysimachus was ruler of both regions, and his power extended to southern Greece and Anatolia). Their relationship was never good.

As Ptolemy Keraunos was becoming more powerful, Arsinoë decided it was time to stop him and conspired against him with her sons. This action caused Ptolemy Keraunos to kill two of her sons, Lysimachus and Philip, while the eldest, Ptolemy, was able to escape and to flee north, to the kingdom of the Dardanians.

Arsinoë sought refuge in the Samothrace temple complex, which she had benefited during her tenure as queen. She eventually left from Samothrace for Alexandria, Egypt, to seek protection from her brother, Ptolemy II Philadelphus.

It is not known which year she left for Egypt. She may have left as early as 280/279 BC, directly after the murder of the younger sons, or as late as 277/276 BC, when the claim of her eldest son to the Macedonian throne had clearly failed, following the succession of Antigonus II Gonatas.

=== Queen of Egypt ===
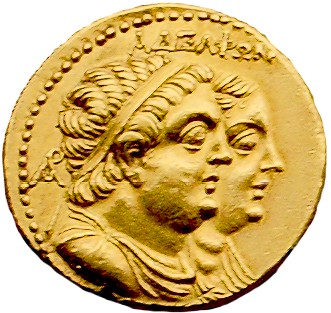
Head of Ptolemy II Philadelphus with Arsinoe II behind. The Greek inscription ΑΔΕΛΦΩΝ means "coin of the siblings".

In Egypt, she is believed to have instigated the accusation and exile of Arsinoe I, the wife of her younger brother Ptolemy II. Whether this belief was correct remains unknown. It is not known which year she arrived in Egypt, nor when her sister-in-law was exiled, nor whether the divorce between her brother and Arsinoe I may have taken place without the involvement of Arsinoe II.

Whatever the case, after the divorce of Ptolemy, Arsinoe II then married her brother. As a result, both were given the epithet "Philadelphoi" (Koine Greek: Φιλάδελφοι "Sibling-lovers"). The closer circumstances and reasons behind the marriage is not known. According to R. A. Hazzard, the year of their marriage is 273 or 272 BC because of the change of the preamble in the papyri. However, Theocritus's poem, probably dated to 274 BC, includes a celebration of the wedding of Ptolemy II and Arsinoe II, suggesting the marriage took place at or shortly before that time. According to Carney, the year of their marriage is c. 275 BC.

Her role as queen was unprecedented in the dynasty at the time and became a role model for later Ptolemaic queens: she acted alongside her brother in ritual and public display, became a religious and literal patron, and was included in the Egyptian and Greek cults created for them by her brother. Sharing in all of her brother's titles, she was quite influential, having towns dedicated to her, her own cult (as was Egyptian custom), appearing on coinage, and contributing to foreign policy, including Ptolemy II's victory in the First Syrian War between Egypt and the Seleucid Empire.

According to Posidippus, she won three chariot races at the Olympic Games, probably in 272 BC.

== Deification ==
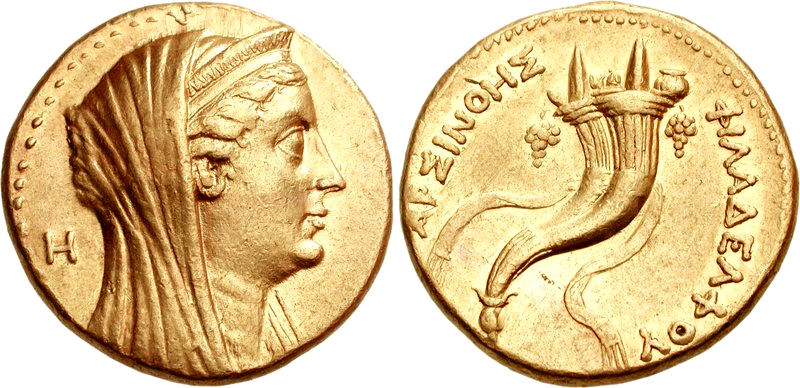
Coin of Arsinoe II struck under the rule of her husband-brother Ptolemy II Philadelphus, including her main divine attributes: the ram's horn and the double cornucopia

She died in 270 or 268 BC and circumstantial evidence supports the latter date. After her death, Ptolemy II established a cult of Arsinoe Philadelphos. She received burial and deification rites at Mendes, where she had been a priestess. Those rites are commemorated in the Mendes stele. This stele also includes the decree of Ptolemy II announcing her cult. All temples in Egypt were required to include a cult statue of Arsinoe II alongside the main deity of the sanctuary. In the relief at the top of the stele, Arsinoe is depicted among the deities receiving sacrifice from Ptolemy - an image that recurs throughout the country. Separate temples were constructed for Arsinoe, at Memphis, and elsewhere. The Fayyum region became the Arsinoite nome, with Arsinoe as its patron goddess. From 263 BC, a portion of tax on orchard and vineyard produce in each nome of Egypt was dedicated to funding the local cult of Arsinoe.

Arsinoe's cult was also propagated in Alexandria. An annual priesthood, known as the Canephorus of Arsinoe Philadelphus, was established by 269 BC. The holder of the office was included as part of the dating formula in all official documents until the late second century BC. An annual procession was held in Arsinoe's honour, led by the Canephorus. Every household along the procession's route was required to erect a small altar of sand and sacrifice birds and lentils for Arsinoe. A large temple was erected by the harbour in Alexandria. The admiral Callicrates of Samos erected another sanctuary at Cape Zephyrium, at the eastern end of the harbour, where Arsinoe was worshipped as Aphrodite Euploia (Aphrodite of the good-sailing). Similar sanctuaries were established at a number of port-cities under Ptolemaic control, including Citium in Cyprus, Delos in the Nesiotic League, and Thera. As a result of these sanctuaries, Arsinoe became closely associated with protection from shipwrecks. Coinage and statuettes depicting the divine Arsinoe survive. Her divine attributes are a small ram's horn behind her ear - symbolising her connection to the ram of Mendes - and a pair of cornucopiae which she carries. She appears in this guise on a set of mass-produced faience Oenochoae, which seem to have been associated with funerary ritual in Alexandria.

Arsinoe seems to have been a genuinely popular goddess throughout the Ptolemaic period, with both Greeks and Egyptians, in Egypt and beyond. 'Arsinoe' is one of the few Greek names to be naturalised as an Egyptian personal name in the period. Altars and dedicatory plaques in her honour are found throughout Egypt and the Aegean, while hundreds of her faience oenochoae have been found in the cemeteries of Alexandria.

== Marriage and issue ==
Arsinoe married Lysimachus of Thrace in 300 or 299 BC and had three children:

Name	Birth	Death	Notes
Ptolemy	299/8 BC	February 240 BC	Co-regent of Egypt with her younger brother, Ptolemy II (267-259 BC), rebelled in 259 BC, subsequently Ptolemaic vassal ruler of Telmessus until 240 BC.
Lysimachus	297/6 BC	279 BC	Murdered by Ptolemy Keraunos.
Philip	294 BC	279 BC	Murdered by Ptolemy Keraunos.

After Lysimachus's death in 281 BC, Arsinoe was briefly married to her half-brother Ptolemy Ceraunus from 280 to 279 BC and then to her full-blooded, younger brother Ptolemy II of Egypt from c. 275 BC until her death. Ptolemy II's children by his first wife Arsinoe I, including his eventual successor Ptolemy III, were posthumously declared to be children of Arsinoe II in the late 260s BC.

== Gallery ==
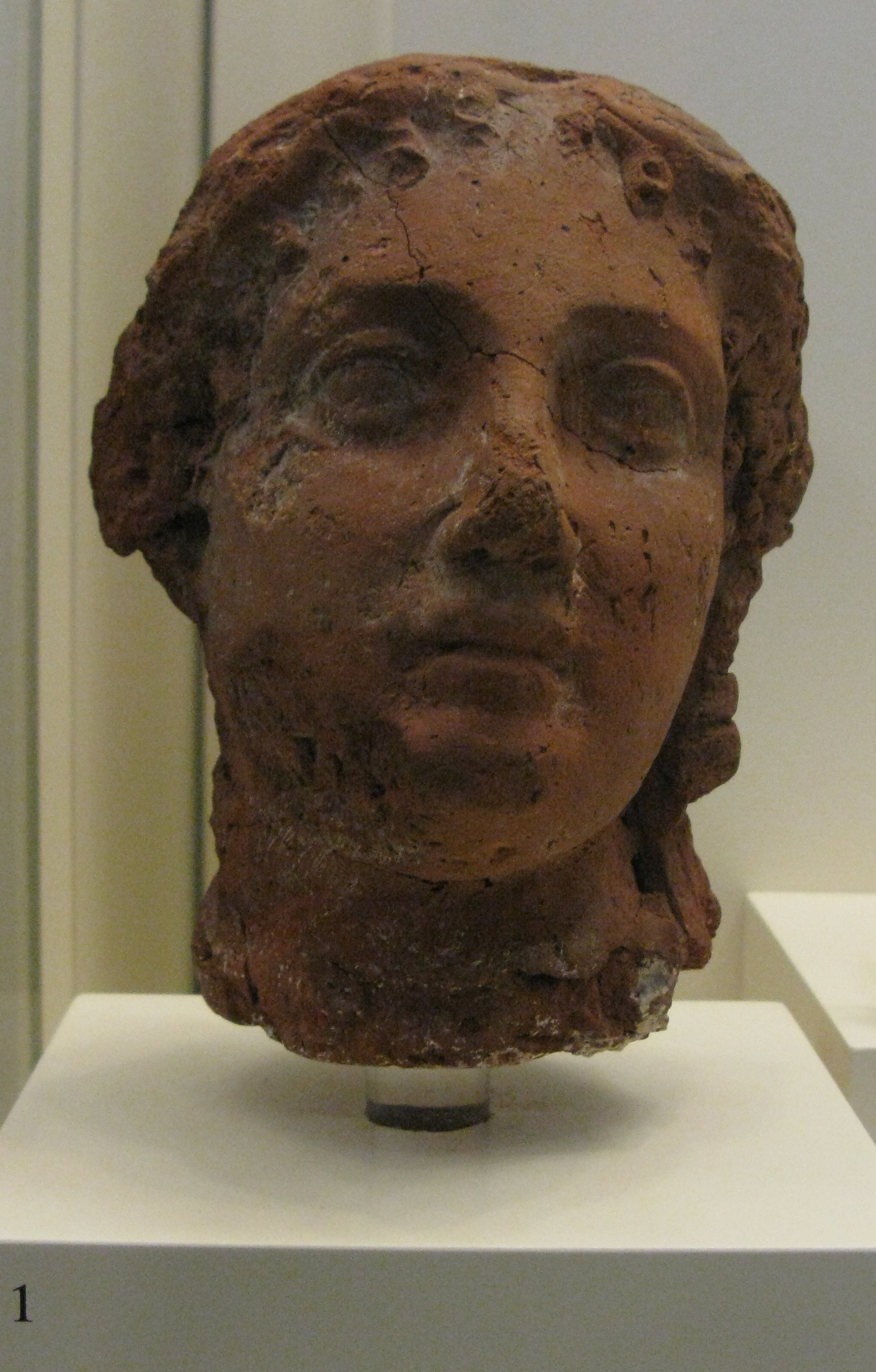
Arsinoe II, a pottery fragment

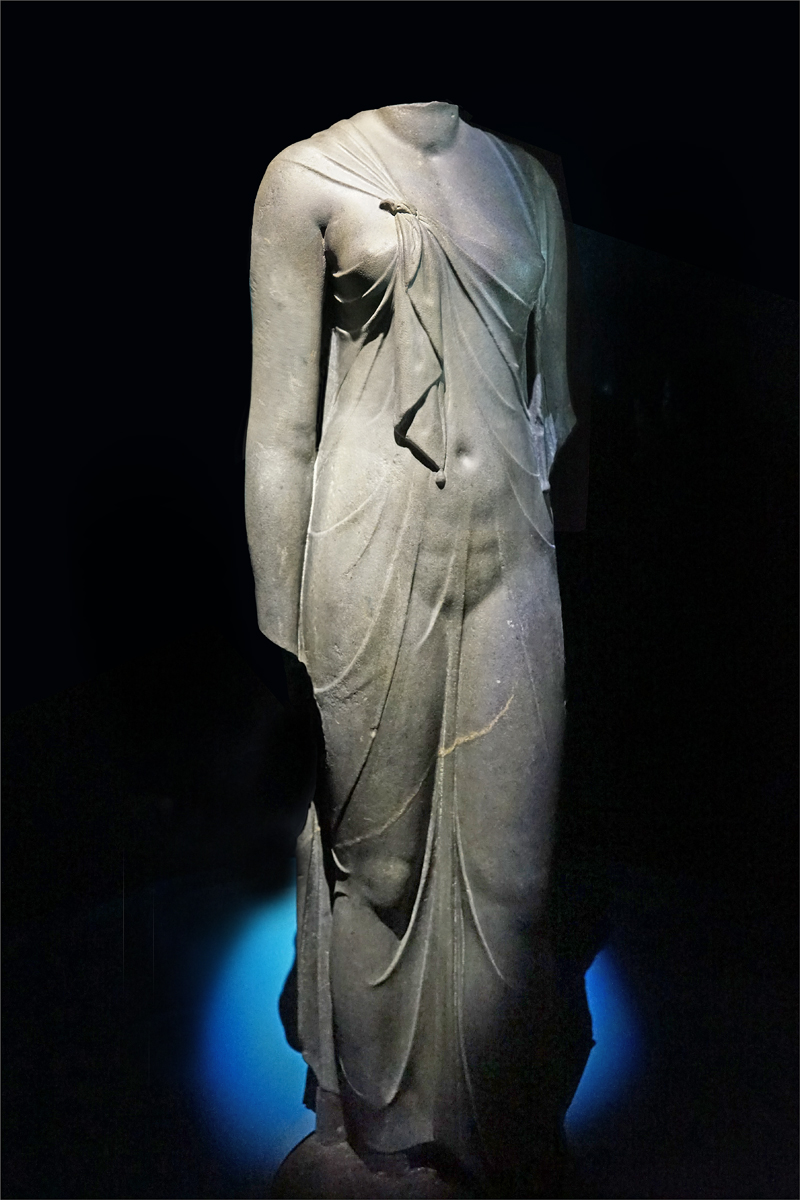
Granodiorite statue of Queen Arsinoe II

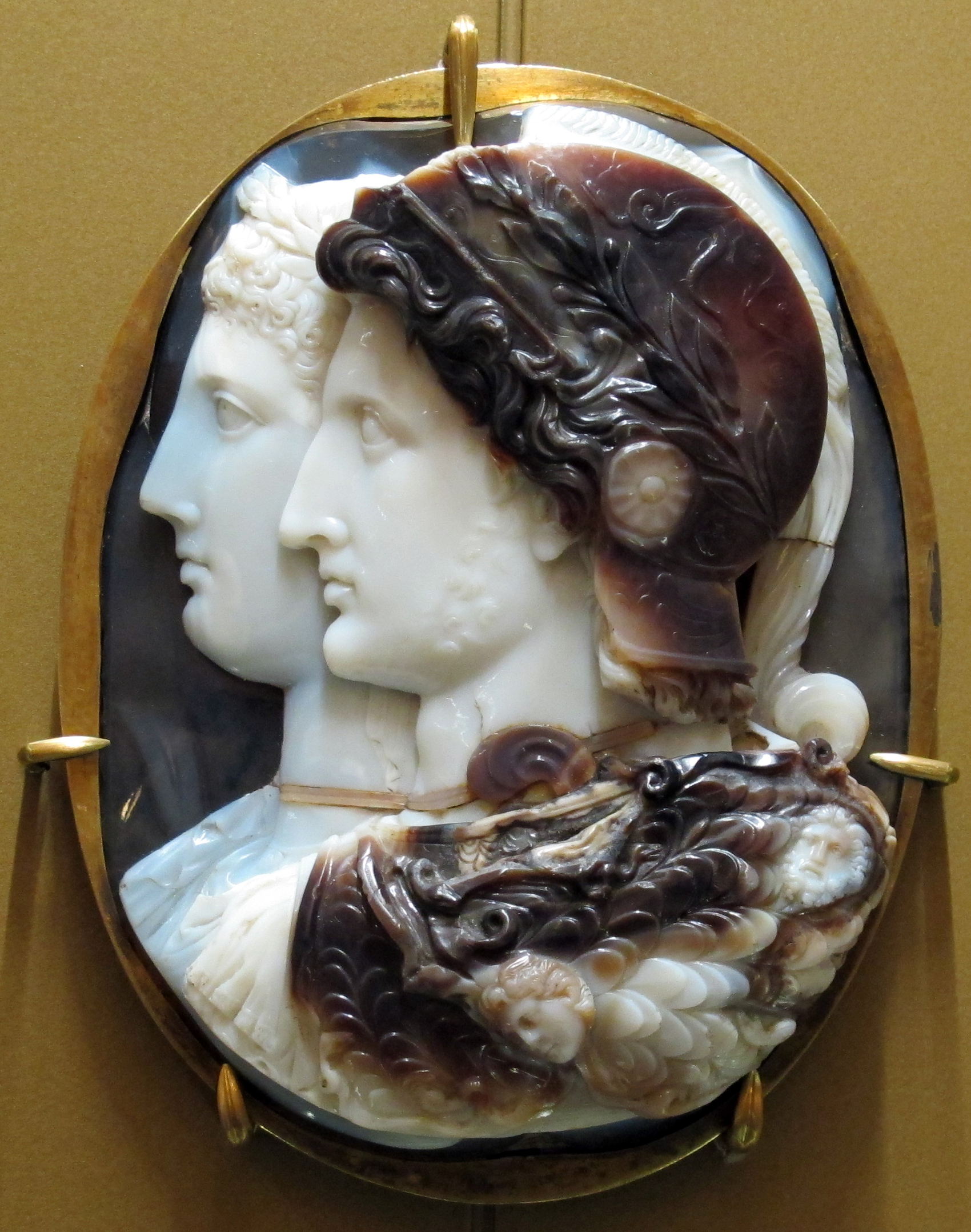
The Gonzaga Cameo in the Hermitage Museum, St. Petersburg; the gem measures 15,7 x 11,8 cm

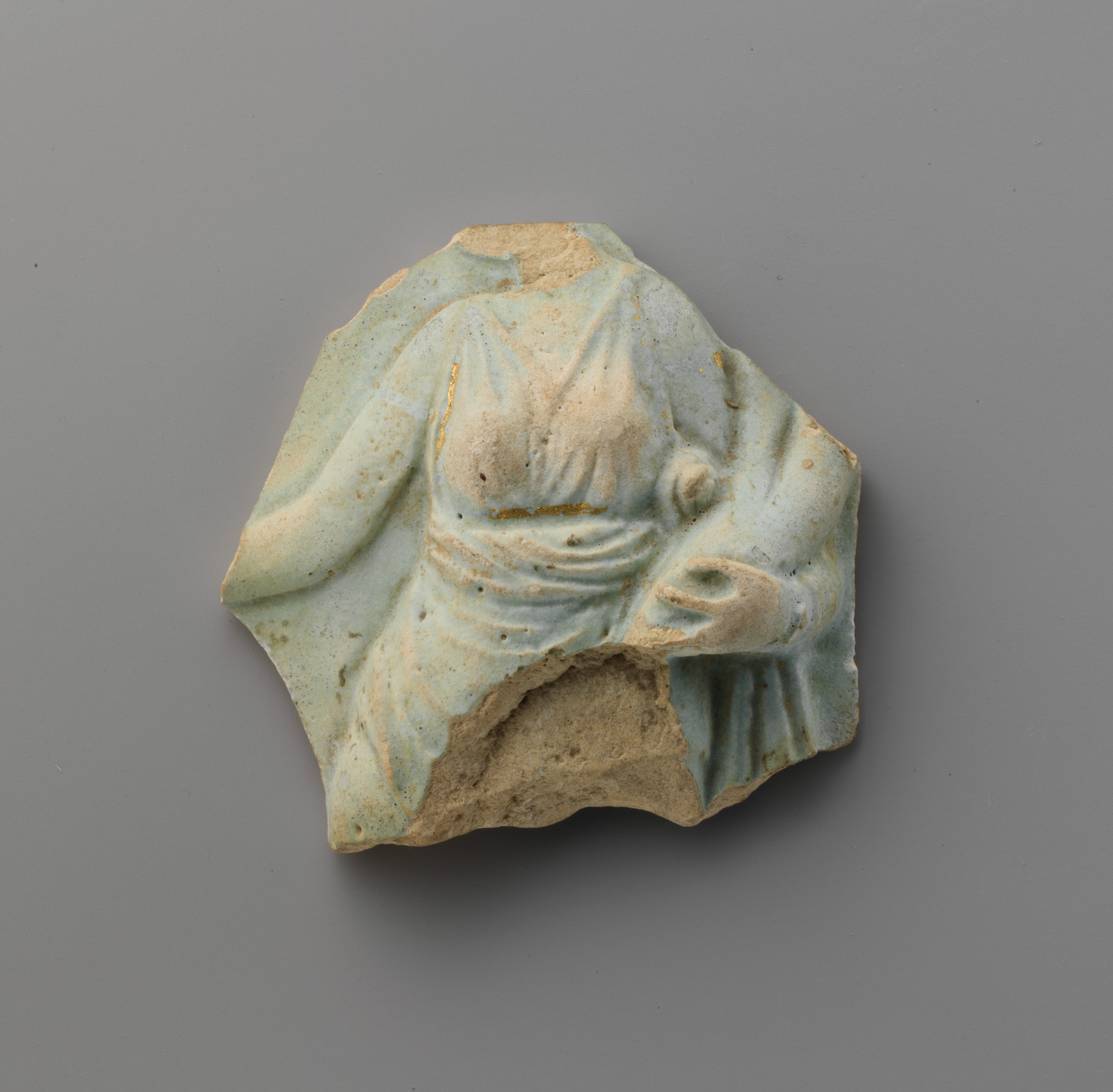
Faience oinochoe with remains of gilding, depicting Arsinoe II

== See also ==
- Arsinoitherium

== Bibliography ==
- Bengtson, H. (1977). Griechische Geschichte von den Anfängen bis in die römische Kaiserzeit. C.H.Beck.
- Billows, R.A. (1995). Kings and colonists: aspects of Macedonian imperialism. Brill.
- Carney, Elizabeth Donnelly (2013). Arsinoe of Egypt and Macedon: A Royal Life. Oxford University Press. ISBN 978-0-19-971101-7.
- Holbl, Gunther (2001). A History of the Ptolemaic Empire. London: Routledge.
- Lorenzi, Rossella (December 2, 2010). "Did female Egyptian pharaoh rule before Cleopatra?". NBC News.
- Posidippus. Milan Papyrus aka P. Mil. Vogl.
- Sewell-Lasater, Tara (2020). "Becoming Kleopatra: Ptolemaic Royal Marriage, Incest, and the Path to Female Rule". University of Houston.
