= Ptolemy Epigonos =

3rd century BCE Greek prince, son of the Diadochi Lysamachus

Ptolemy Epigonos Πτολεμαίος ὁ Έπίγονος

Pharaoh and King of the Ptolemaic Kingdom
- Reign: c.267–c.259/258 BC
- Coregency: Ptolemy II Philadelphus
- Consort: unknown Greek woman
- Children: Lysimachus; Epigonus
- Father: Lysimachus
- Mother: Arsinoe II
- Born: c. 299 BC; Ephesus
- Died: 240 BC (aged c. 59)

Ptolemy Epigonos (Greek: Πτολεμαίος ὁ Έπίγονος Ptolemaios Epigonos, Epigonos i.e. the heir, 299/298 BC – February 240 BC) was a Greek Prince from Asia Minor who was of Macedonian and Thessalian descent.

== Family background ==
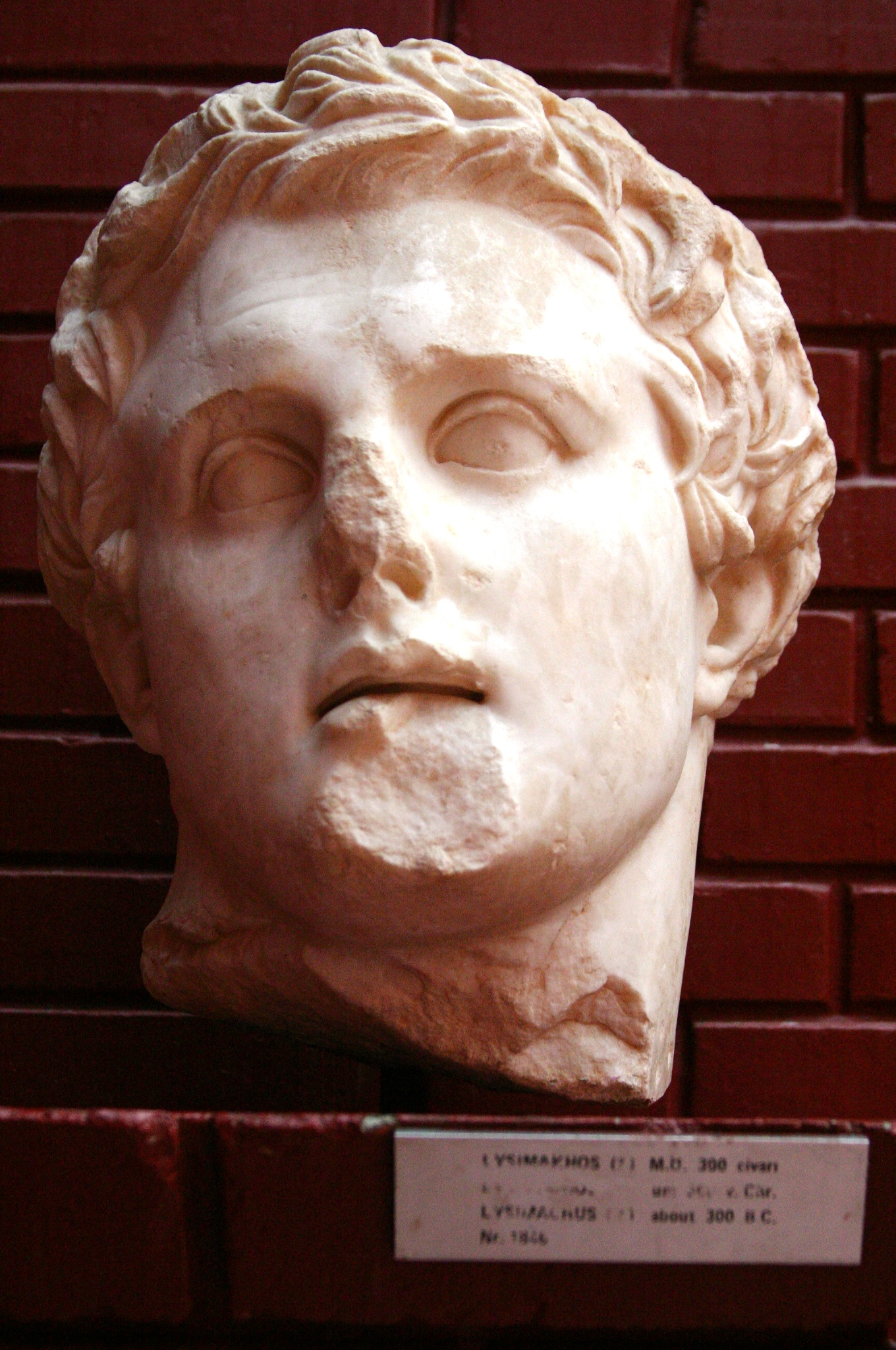
Bust of Lysimachus at the Ephesus Archaeological Museum.

Ptolemy was the first son born to Lysimachus and Arsinoe II. Ptolemy had two younger full-blooded brothers: Lysimachus and Philip.

His father Lysimachus, one of the Diadochi of Alexander the Great, was King of Thrace, Asia Minor and Macedonia. His paternal grandfather was Agathocles of Pella, a nobleman who was a contemporary to King Philip II of Macedon and his paternal grandmother was an unnamed woman perhaps named Arsinoe. From his father's previous marriages and from an Odrysian concubine, Ptolemy had two older paternal half-brothers: Agathocles, Alexander and two older paternal half-sisters: Eurydice, Arsinoe I and perhaps another unnamed sister who may have been the first wife of Ptolemy Keraunos.

His mother Arsinoe II, was a Ptolemaic princess who married his father as his third wife and married him as her first husband. She was a daughter born to Ptolemy I Soter and Berenice I of Egypt and was a sister to the Pharaoh Ptolemy II Philadelphus. Ptolemy I was another of the Diadochi who later founded the Ptolemaic dynasty of Ancient Egypt and Berenice I was the great-niece of the powerful regent Antipater. Ptolemy was the namesake of his maternal grandfather and was the first grandchild born to Ptolemy I and his wife, Berenice I.

== Early life ==
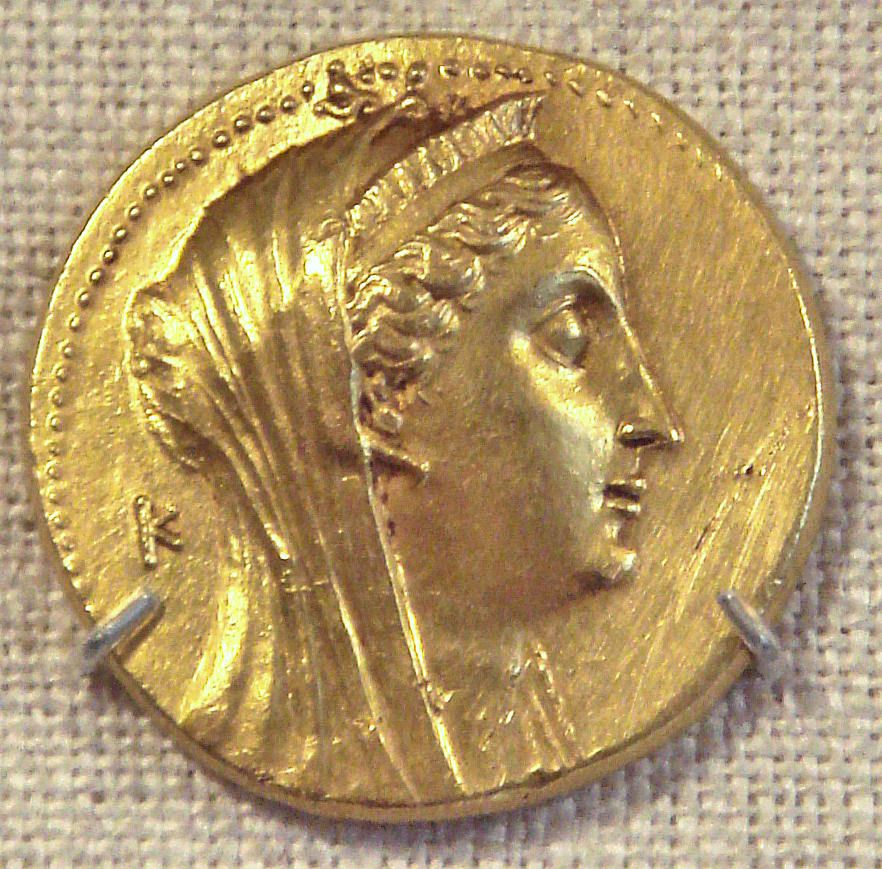
Coin of Arsinoe II (struck under the rule of her husband-brother Ptolemy II Philadelphus)

Ptolemy was born and raised in Ephesus, which was renamed for a time Arsinoea after his mother. In 282 BC, his mother accused his half-brother Agathocles of treason and his father ordered the execution of Agathocles. After the death of his half-brother, Agathocles’ cousin-wife Lysandra with their children fled to Seleucus I Nicator in Babylon. Seleucus I used this bitter dynastic succession feud as an opportunity to expand his dominions. In the Battle of Corupedium in 281 BC, Seleucus I defeated Lysimachus. Seleucus I added Asia Minor and part of Thrace to his empire.

His mother only held control of the Aegean part of his father's kingdom. After the death of his father, Arsinoe II and her sons fled to Cassandreia. In order to protect, secure Arsinoe II and her son's sovereignty and his father's kingdom, Ptolemy's mother married his maternal uncle Ptolemy Keraunos, who was his mother's older paternal half-brother. Ptolemy Keraunos lived in his father Lysimachus' kingdom as a political exile and prior to marrying his mother had murdered Seleucus I in order to gain the power of his former protector and then rushed to Lysimachia where he had himself acclaimed king by the Macedonian army.

The union between Arsinoe II and Ptolemy Keraunos was purely political as they both claimed the Macedonian, Thracian thrones and by the time of Ptolemy father's death his power extended to southern Greece. Arsinoe II's marriage to her half-brother wasn't a happy one. Through his marriage to Arsinoe II, Ptolemy Keraunos’ political position would be strengthened. As Ptolemy's uncle-stepfather was becoming too powerful, Arsinoe II conspired with her sons against him, while he was away on a campaign. Ptolemy Keraunos quickly retaliated by capturing Cassandreia and killing Ptolemy's brothers Lysimachus and Philip. Arsinoe II and Ptolemy were able to escape.

== Attempted claim of the Macedonian throne ==
Arsinoe II fled to Egypt to Ptolemy II for protection against Ptolemy Keraunos. Ptolemy Keraunos' brief reign ended in 279 BC as he was captured and killed during the Gallic invasion of the Balkans led by Bolgios who conducted a series of mass raids on mainland Greece. Ptolemy by then was the oldest and only surviving son of Lysimachus. As the son and heir of the great Lysimachus, he seemed to be destined to be something more than a mere regional dynast after the assassination of half-brother Agathocles. His new position as the heir apparent as one of the great empires of the early Hellenistic period didn't last long after the deaths of his father, Lysimachus, and uncle and stepfather, Ptolemy Keraunos, which lead to the complete dissolutions of their kingdoms.

In the aftermath of the death of Ptolemy Keraunos chaos was brought to the Greek mainland. In this period 279 BC-277 BC, Ptolemy Epigonos fled to the Illyrian Kingdom. With the help of their King Monunios, Ptolemy Epigonos tried unsuccessfully to recover Macedonia and again probably in 278 BC without success. He is mentioned as one of the claimants in the period of anarchy following the reign of Sosthenes. The chaos lasted until Antigonus II Gonatas defeated the Gauls in battle near Lysimachia, Thrace in 277 BC. After his victory, Antigonus II was recognised as Macedonian King and his power extended to southern Greece.

== Co-regency of the Ptolemaic Kingdom ==
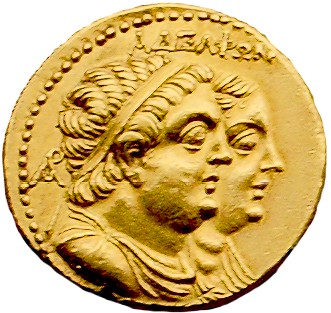
Coin of Ptolemy II Philadelphus and Arsinoe II.

After his failed attempted to regain the Macedonian Kingdom, Ptolemy eventually went to the Ptolemaic Kingdom to live with his relatives. Ptolemy II then was married to his only remaining paternal half-sister, Arsinoe I, by whom he had two sons, Ptolemy III Euergetes and Lysimachus, and a daughter, Berenice. At an unknown date between after 279 BC-274/3 BC, Ptolemy's mother arrived in Egypt. Probably at the instigation of Arsinoe II, charges of conspiring to assassinate Ptolemy II were soon brought against Arsinoe I. Ptolemy II had convicted Arsinoe I of plotting against him. He ended his marriage to Arsinoe I and divorced her. Ptolemy II had exiled Arsinoe I to Coptos in southern Egypt.

Ptolemy's mother married her brother, Ptolemy II. Arsinoe II died at an unknown date between July 270 BC-260 BC. Ptolemy II at some point after his mother's death had his children legally declared as the children of Arsinoe II and had the sons of Arsinoe II legally declared as the children of Ptolemy II.

Ptolemy Epigonos disappears from the historical records from the time of his failed attempt to reclaim the Macedonian throne till the death of Arsinoe II. According to surviving portraits, inscriptions, coinage and papyri, Ptolemy was made co-regent of the Ptolemaic Kingdom by Ptolemy II. There may have been several reasons why Ptolemy II made Ptolemy his co-regent: to relieve him of some of his duties; to have the remaining living child of Arsinoe II to have as a help rather than a burden and support for the Chremonidean War which began at the beginning of the co-regency.

The earliest attested date for his co-regency with his maternal uncle-adopted father is from papyri dated from November 267 BC, while the last dated reference from his co-regency is September 10, 259 BC. There is a possibility Ptolemy may have been betrothed to his maternal cousin-paternal niece-adopted sister Berenice. Ptolemy is shown as an adult on the Great Mendes Stela, where he is depicted wearing the pharaoh’s war crown, which is suggested that Ptolemy is playing an active role in court life and later in military affairs. His portrait on the Mendes Stela is dated from 264/3 BC. The wearing of this crown reveals and gives a significant statement; as it was used as a symbol of coronation and legitimate pharaonic succession. According to the surviving evidence, Ptolemy was to be the intended heir and successor of Ptolemy II.

== Revolt and rule over Telmessos ==
In 262/261 BC, Ptolemy II sent Ptolemy to the city of Miletus in Asia Minor, to represent the Pharaoh in reporting political conditions back to him. The tyrant Timarchus was in charge of that city. For unknown reasons, Ptolemy with Timarchus led a revolt against Ptolemy II in 259/258 BC. It is possible that Ptolemy may have revolted against Ptolemy II because Ptolemy II may have wanted Ptolemy to hand over his command in Asia Minor to him. Ptolemy and Timarchus’ revolt didn't help Ptolemy II's strategic planning in Asia Minor as in 258 BC, Timarchus was slain by the Seleucid King Antiochus II Theos during the course of the Second Syrian War which was between the Ptolemaic Kingdom and the Seleucid Empire which resulted in war losses including Miletus being captured by Antiochus II.

After the revolt had ended in 258 BC, Ptolemy II could have reconciled with Ptolemy and probably may have forgiven him due to his fear of the growing power of the Seleucid Empire. Ptolemy II terminated Ptolemy's co-regency with him and made him renounce any claims he had to Egyptian throne. After this occurred, Ptolemy II gave Ptolemy a city in Asia Minor called Telmessos in Lycia, to govern in his own right and establish his own dynasty. The city of Telmessos, prior to being under Ptolemaic rule was previously under the kingship of Ptolemy's late father Lysimachus, thus Ptolemy would become a client monarch and have a client kingdom to rule under the Ptolemaic Kingdom. A surviving inscription from Telmessos dated from 258 BC, reveals an arms-length accord that Ptolemy reached with the Egyptian government and indicates that Ptolemy II made Ptolemy a Ptolemaic official in the area and was given a large estate in the area by the Pharaoh. Ptolemy ruled as a Ptolemaic Client King of Telmessos from late 258 BC until his death in February 240 BC.

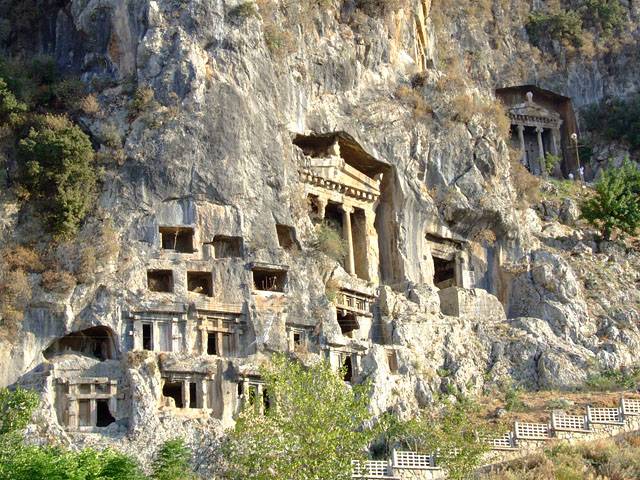
Hellenistic rock-cut tombs at Telmessus

In his co-regency with Ptolemy II and in particular his rule of Telmessos, Ptolemy re-established and continued the rule of the Lysimachid dynasty, which is also known as the Ptolemaic/Lysimachid dynasty in Lycia. The evidence below reveals that Ptolemy was in a semi-autonomous position typical of the Hellenistic dynasts:

- He remained subordinate loyal to Ptolemy II and Ptolemy III.
- He recommended a philos or friend, for honors and altered the tax burden of Telmessos.
- He appeared to have caused the Telmessians to issue coinage with types borrowed from the coinages of his father Lysimachus and with a monogram (ΠΤ) representing his own name, and to have made other internal dispensations in Telmessian institutions without apparent reference to his Ptolemaic suzerain. He made one archon at the head of the city government instead of the previous three and making a hiereus the eponymous magistracy instead of the archons.
- After he died, Ptolemy had descendants ruling over Telmessos.

Ptolemy had an extraordinary degree of autonomy and was loosely under the authority of the Ptolemaic Pharaohs. Ptolemy had achieved substantial influence in Telmessos and in the surrounding local cities in the region. He established himself in Telmessos to the extent that he was mentioned in a decree honoring a certain Leimon son of Antipater, who is said to be a philos or friend of Ptolemy, which was mentioned as one of the motivating factors in the decree.

Ptolemy changed the payment to the tenth of the produce on apomeira or levies on beams, grain, millet, pulse, sesame, wheat and other crops in Telmessos. He levied orchard crops and the use of pasture land, taxies typical of Ptolemaic practices in Egypt. It is unknown how much time these agricultural levies lasted for and through Ptolemy's taxation reforms he was honored with a decree. The taxation reforms for Telmessos was out of the ordinary for the citizens of the city and was a big shift from a complicated system of taxation and rents imposed by the Ptolemies that was elsewhere known in Asia Minor.

Before he died in 240 BC, Ptolemy III honored Ptolemy in another decree in the city assuring the city still recognised the authority of the King in Alexandria and to Ptolemy's good care of the city. When Ptolemy died an honorific surviving inscription dedicated to him reads: Ptolemy son of Ptolemy and Arsinoe the Theoi Philadelphoi (the Sibling-loving Gods). At the death of Ptolemy, he was the last surviving child of the Diadoch Lysimachus. At an unknown date, perhaps during his co-regency with Ptolemy II or in his rule over Telmessos, Ptolemy married an unnamed Greek aristocratic woman by whom he had two sons: Lysimachus of Telmessos who later succeeded him as the second Ptolemaic client ruler of Telmessos and Epigonos of Telmessos.

== His identity ==
The identity of Ptolemy is perhaps the most confusing and controversial of Ptolemaic genealogy. Ptolemy is also identified as the following:

- Ptolemy Epigone, also known as Ptolemy the Epigone, Epigone (Epigonos) i.e. the heir, he is known from an inscription at Telmessos. The sons of the Diadochi of Alexander the Great were widely referred to as the Epigonoi or the heirs. This also reveals his succession status and relations to the Ptolemaic Kingdom, the kingdom of his late father and being the brief heir to the kingdom of his mother and his uncle Ptolemy Keraunos.
- Ptolemy Nios or Ptolemy ‘the Son’, which he was known during his co-regency with Ptolemy II as he was the adopted son and supposed first intended heir of Ptolemy II.
- Ptolemy ‘the Brother’, refers to his relationship with Ptolemy III.
- Ptolemy of Telmessos, this was his title when he ruled Telmessos.
- Ptolemaios Lysimachou or simply, Ptolemy, son of Lysimachus.

== See also ==
- Aristander

== Bibliography ==
- Lysimachus’ article at Livius.org
- Berenice I's article at Livius.org
- Arsinoe II’s article at Livius.org
- Christopher Bennett, Ptolemaic Genealogy (2001-2013)
- Tunny, Jennifer Ann (2000). "Ptolemy 'the Son' Reconsidered_ Are there too many Ptolemies?" (PDF). Zeitschrift für Papyrologie und Epigraphik. 131: 83–92.
- Bagnall, R.S. (1976). The administration of the Ptolemaic possessions outside Egypt. Brill.
- Bengtson, H. (1977). Griechische Geschichte von den Anfängen bis in die römische Kaiserzeit. C.H.Beck.
- Billows, R.A. (1995). Kings and colonists: aspects of Macedonian imperialism. Brill.
- Hölbl, G. (2001). A History of the Ptolemaic Empire. Routledge.
