= Lysimachus (son of Lysimachus) =

Greek Prince of Macedonian and Thessalian descent

Lysimachus also known as Lysimachus Junior (Greek: Λυσίμαχος, 297/296 BC-279 BC) was a Greek Prince from Asia Minor who was of Macedonian and Thessalian descent.

== Family background ==
Lysimachus was the second son born to Lysimachus and Arsinoe II. He was the namesake of his father. Lysimachus had two full-blooded brothers: an older brother called Ptolemy I Epigone and a younger brother called Philip.

His father Lysimachus was one of the Diadochi of Alexander the Great who was King of Thrace, Asia Minor and Macedonia. His paternal grandfather was Agathocles of Pella a nobleman who was a contemporary to King Philip II of Macedon and his paternal grandmother was an unnamed woman perhaps named Arsinoe. From his father's previous marriages and from an Odrysian concubine, Lysimachus had two older paternal half-brothers: Agathocles, Alexander and two older paternal half-sisters: Eurydice, Arsinoe I and perhaps another unnamed sister who may have been the first wife of Ptolemy Keraunos.

His mother Arsinoe II, was a Ptolemaic Greek Princess who married his father as his third wife and married him as her first husband. She was a daughter born to Ptolemy I Soter and Berenice I of Egypt and was a sister to the Pharaoh Ptolemy II Philadelphus. Ptolemy I was another of the Diadochi of Alexander the Great who later founded the Ptolemaic dynasty of Ancient Egypt and Berenice I was the great-niece of the powerful Regent Antipater.

== Life ==
Lysimachus was born and raised in Ephesus, which was renamed for a time Arsinoea after his mother. In 282 BC, his mother accused his half-brother Agathocles of treason and his father ordered the execution of Agathocles. After the death of his half-brother, Agathocles’ cousin-wife Lysandra with their children fled to Seleucus I Nicator in Babylon. Seleucus I used this bitter dynastic succession feud as an opportunity to expand his dominions. In the Battle of Corupedium in 281 BC, Seleucus I defeated Lysimachus in which his father died in battle. Seleucus I added Asia Minor and part of Thrace to his empire.

His mother only held control of the Aegean part of his father's kingdom. After the death of his father, Arsinoe II and her sons fled to Cassandreia. In order to protect and secure Arsinoe II and her son's sovereignty and his father's kingdom, Lysimachus’ mother married his maternal uncle, Ptolemy Keraunos, who was his mother's older paternal half-brother. Ptolemy Keraunos lived in his father's kingdom as a political exile and, prior to marrying Lysimachus' mother, had murdered Seleucus I in order to gain the power of his former protector and then rushed to Lysimachia where he had himself acclaimed king by the Macedonian army.

The union between Arsinoe II and Ptolemy Keraunos was purely political as they both claimed the Macedonian and Thracian thrones. By the time of Lysimachus' father's death, Ptolemy Keraunos' power extended into Greece.

Arsinoe II's marriage to her half-brother wasn't a happy one. Through his marriage to Arsinoe II, Ptolemy Keraunos’ political position was strengthened. As Ptolemy Keraunos was becoming too powerful, Arsinoe II conspired with her sons against him while he was away on a campaign. Ptolemy Keraunos quickly retaliated by capturing Cassandreia and killing Lysimachus and his brother Philip. Arsinoe II and Lysimachus' other brother Ptolemy were able to escape. Later on his brother Ptolemy and his mother fled to Egypt, where his mother married his other maternal uncle Ptolemy II Philadelphus.

Lysimachus’ mother died at an unknown date between 270 and 260 BC. At had some point after his mother's death, Ptolemy II had his children legally declared as the children of Arsinoe II and had the sons of Arsinoe II legally declared as his children.

== Sources ==
- Lysimachus’ article at Livius.org
- Arsinoe II’s article at Livius.org
- Ptolemaic Genealogy: Arsinoe II
- Ptolemaic Genealogy: Ptolemy "the Son"
- Ptolemaic Genealogy: Ptolemy Ceraunus
- Ptolemaic Genealogy: Unknown wife of Ptolemy Ceraunus
- H. Bengtson, Griechische Geschichte von den Anfängen bis in die römische Kaiserzeit, C.H.Beck, 1977
- R.A. Billows, Kings and colonists: aspects of Macedonian imperialism, BRILL, 1995
- G. Hölbl, A History of the Ptolemaic Empire, Routledge, 2001
