= Alcimachus =

Alcimachus or Alkimachos (Greek: Ἀλκίμαχος) is an ancient Greek name and may refer to:

- Alcimachus (painter), a painter mentioned by Pliny. He painted a picture of Dioxippus, a victor in the pancratium at Olympia.
- Alcimachus, father of Agathocles of Pella
- Alcimachus, father of Euphorbus, a traitor who betrayed Eretria to Persians
- Alcimachus of Apollonia, first son of the Thessalian Agathocles and the eldest brother of Lysimachus, who was a general and diplomat of Alexander the Great
- Alcimachus, son to the above named and nephew of Lysimachus
- Alkimachos of Pydna, Macedonian-Epirote buried in Pydna
- Alcimachus, an Athenian general from the deme Anagyrous
- Alcimachus, a Macedonian
