= Autolycus (disambiguation) =

Autolycus (Ancient Greek: Αὐτόλυκος) may be:

- Autolycus, renowned thief and grandfather of Odysseus
- Autolycus, son of Deimachus, Thessalian and Argonaut
- Autolycus of Athens (5th century BC), Athenian sportsman
- Autolycus (areopagite) (4th century BC), Athenian judge
- Autolycus of Pitane, ancient Greek mathematician
- Autodicus (also known as Autolycus), son of Agathocles of Pella

Autolycus may also refer to:

- Autolycus (comics), a Marvel Comics character
- Autolycus (crater), a lunar crater named after Autolycus of Pitane
- Autolycus (painting), an 1836 work by Charles Robert Leslie
- Autolycus (submarine detector), a detector for diesel fumes, used for submarine detection during the Cold War
- Ad Autolycum (Apology to Autolycus), writing of Theophilus of Antioch
- A character in The Winter's Tale by William Shakespeare
- A character in the Hercules and Xena: Warrior Princess television programs.
- Autolycus, the pet jackdaw of fictional detective Albert Campion
- Pen name of South Australian journalist Charles Richard Wilton
