= Ptolemy Ceraunus =

King of Macedonia in 281–279 BC

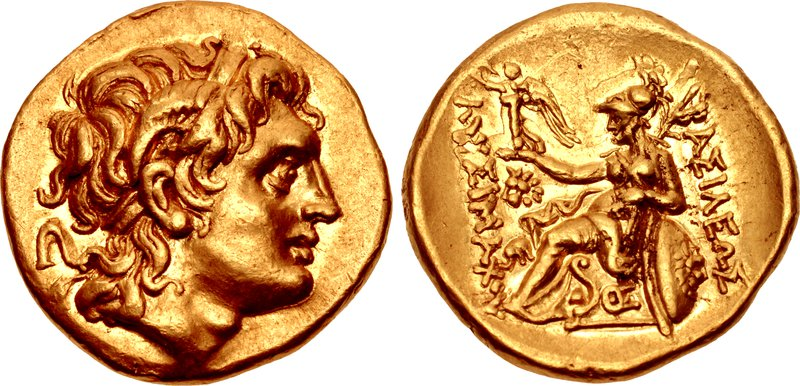
- Stater of Ptolemy Keraunos

King of Macedon
- Reign: 281 – 279 BC
- Predecessor: Lysimachus
- Successor: Meleager
- Born: ca. 319 BC; Alexandria
- Died: January/February 279 BC
- Spouse: Unknown woman (possibly daughter of Lysimachus); Arsinoe II of Egypt
- Greek: Πτολεμαῖος Κεραυνός
- House: Ptolemaic dynasty
- Father: Ptolemy I Soter
- Mother: Eurydice, daughter of Antipater

Ptolemy Ceraunus (Ancient Greek: Πτολεμαῖος Κεραυνός Ptolemaios Keraunos; c. 319 BC – January/February 279 BC) was a member of the Ptolemaic dynasty and briefly king of Macedon. As the son of Ptolemy I Soter, he was originally heir to the throne of Ptolemaic Egypt, but he was displaced in favour of his younger brother Ptolemy II Philadelphus. He fled to King Lysimachus of Thrace and Macedon where he was involved in court intrigue that led to the fall of that kingdom in 281 BC to Seleucus I, whom he then assassinated. He then seized the throne of Macedon, which he ruled for seventeen months before his death in battle against the Gauls in early 279 BC. His epithet Ceraunus is Greek for "Thunderbolt" and referred to his impatient, impetuous, and destructive character.

== Early life and departure from Egypt ==
Ptolemy was the eldest son of Ptolemy I Soter, King of Egypt, and his first wife Eurydice, daughter of Antipater, regent of Macedon. His father was a general of Alexander the Great, whom he succeeded, and founded the Ptolemaic dynasty. He was probably born in 319 BC, soon after his parents' marriage, being the first of their six children. Sometime between 317 and 314 BC, Ptolemy I married one of Eurydice's ladies-in-waiting, Berenice and had further children, including another son, the future Ptolemy II. Initially Ptolemy Ceraunus was the heir presumptive, but as Berenice's son grew older, a power struggle developed between the two half-brothers, which culminated in Ptolemy Ceraunus' departure from Egypt around 287 BC. Ptolemy II was formally elevated to the status of co-regent by Ptolemy I on 28 March 284 BC.

== Fall of Lysimachus and Seleucus ==
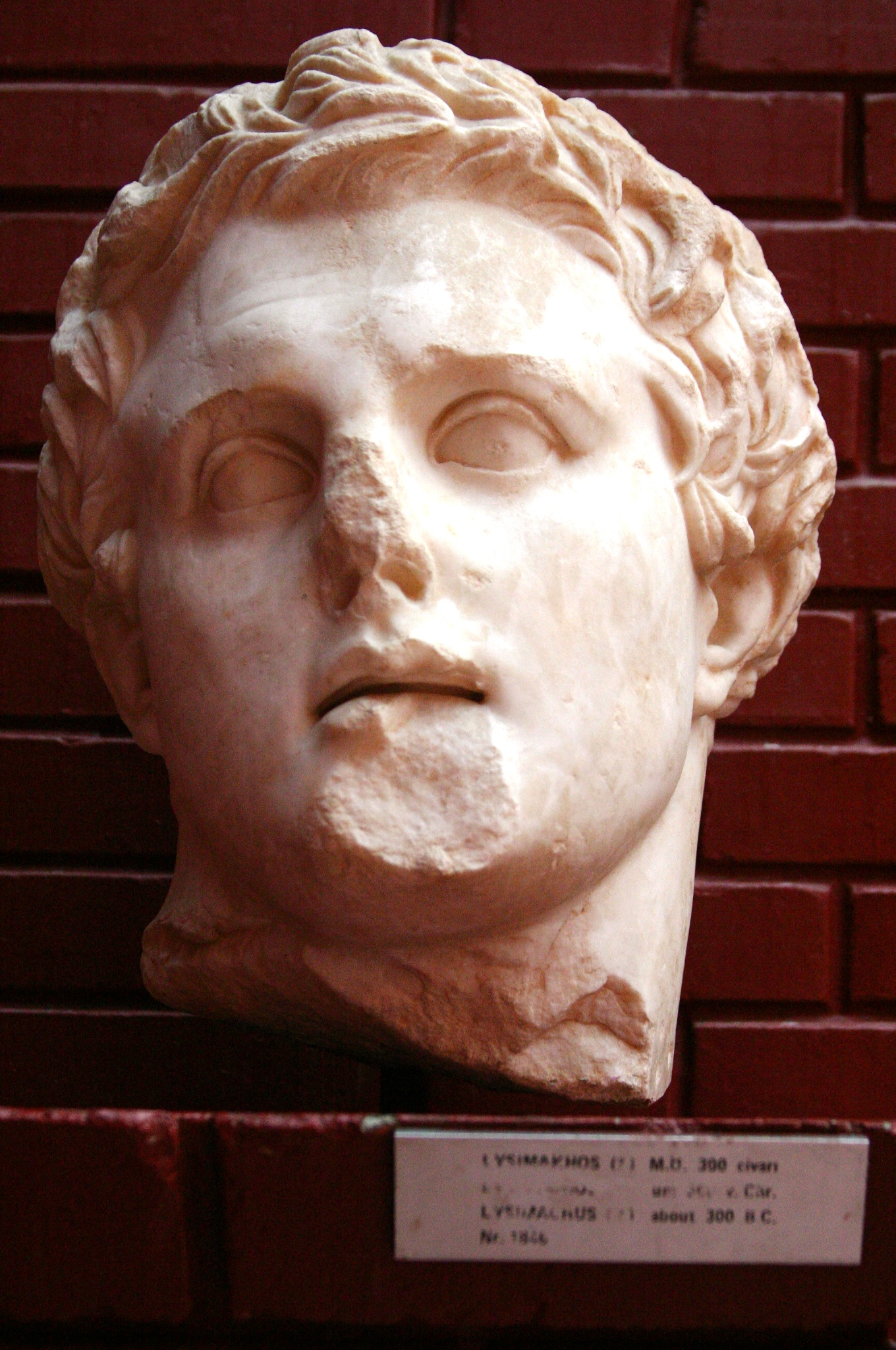
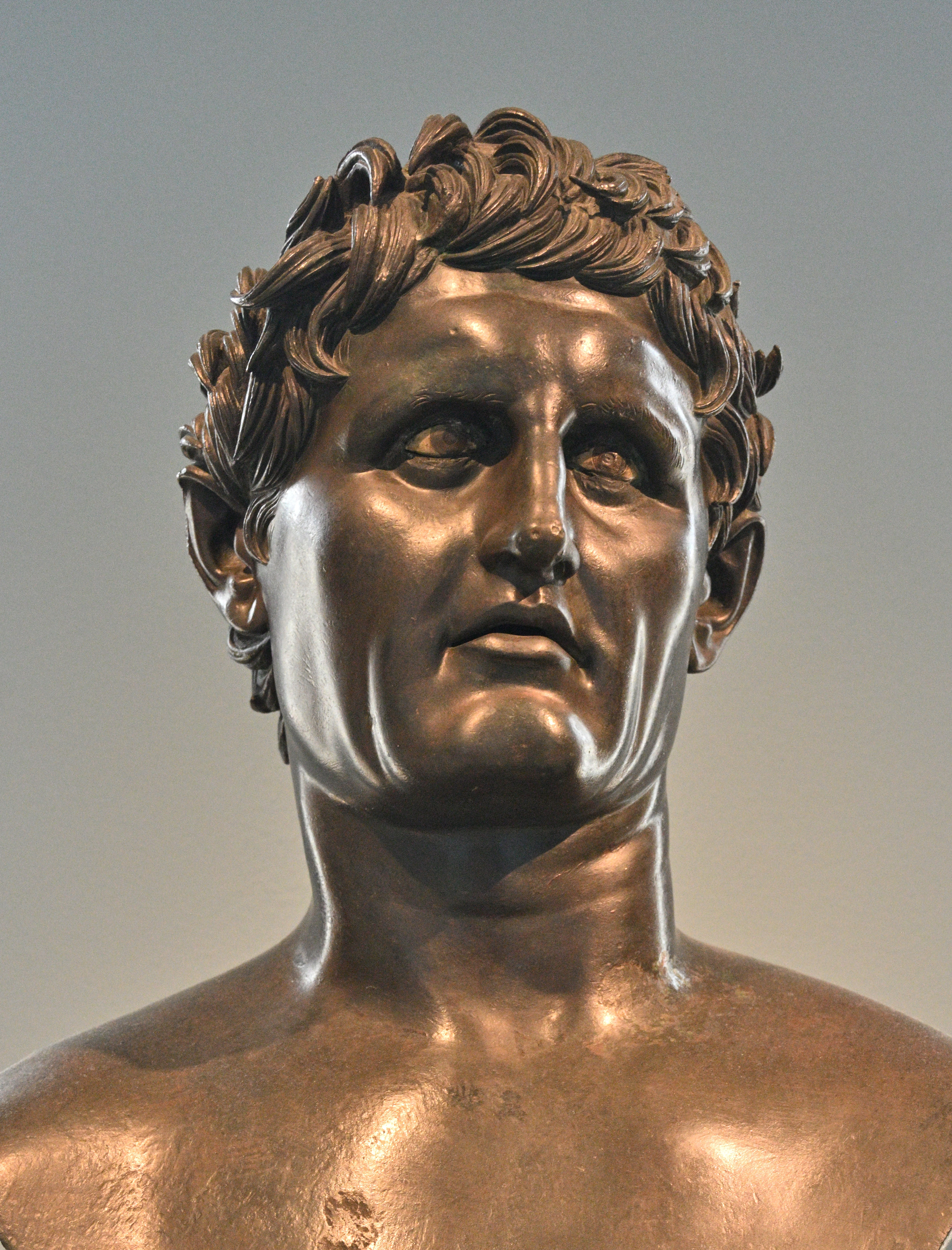
Busts of Lysimachus (left) and Seleucus (right).

Following his departure from Egypt, Ptolemy Ceraunus went to the court of Lysimachus, who ruled Macedon, Thrace and western Asia Minor and who may have been his father-in-law. Lysimachus’ court was divided on the question of supporting Ceraunus. On the one hand, Lysimachus himself had been married to Ptolemy II's full sister, Arsinoe II, since 300 BC. On the other hand, Lysimachus' heir, Agathocles, was married to Ceraunus' full sister Lysandra. The two sisters were already engaged in conflict over the succession, which Ceraunus' arrival probably exacerbated. Lysimachus ultimately chose to support Ptolemy II and sealed that decision at some point between 284 and 281 BC by marrying his daughter Arsinoe I to Ptolemy II.

Continued conflict within Lysimachus' court led to the execution of Agathocles in 282 BC. The course of events and Ptolemy Ceraunus' role in them is unclear. According to one historian, Memnon, it was Ptolemy Ceraunus who carried out the murder of Agathocles. All other sources that mention Ceraunus place him on Agathocles' side in this dispute and report that he accompanied Agathocles' widow, his full-sister Lysandra, in her flight to the court of Seleucus I. The murder provoked a massive outcry from Lysimachus' subjects. Seeing an opportunity to intervene for his own gain, Seleucus invaded Lysimachus' kingdom early in 281 BC. This campaign culminated in the Battle of Corupedium, at which Lysimachus was killed and Seleucus annexed his kingdom to his empire. After the Battle of Corupedium, Ptolemy Ceraunus came into Seleucus' control. Seleucus took Ceraunus into his inner circle and perhaps planned to use him as a bargaining chip in the event of conflict with Ptolemaic Egypt.

In September 281 BC, Seleucus crossed the Hellespont and prepared to invade Macedon. But as Seleucus was sacrificing at a place called Argos, Ptolemy Ceraunus murdered him, intending to seize control of the territories of his former protector. Ceraunus was thus responsible for the death of the last of the Diadochi, the successors of Alexander the Great.

== King of Macedon ==
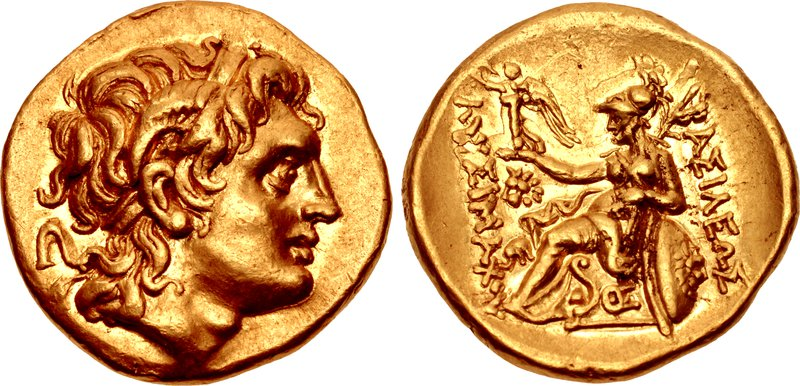
Gold stater in the name of Lysimachus, depicting Alexander the Great, issued c. 280 BC, possibly by Ptolemy Ceraunus.

After assassinating Seleucus, Ceraunus rushed to Lysimachia where he had himself acclaimed king by the portion of Seleucus' army that was present there. At this time he also formally relinquished his claim to the Egyptian throne. A series of gold staters and silver tetradrachms minted at Lysimachia appear to belong to this period. They have the same design as earlier coinage of Lysimachus: the head of Alexander the Great with the horn of Ammon on the obverse and a depiction of Athena seated, holding up a Nike on the reverse. The legend of the coins reads ΒΑΣΙΛΕΩΣ ΛΥΣΙΜΑΧΟΥ (of King Lysimachus) and the reverse includes two small symbols: a lion's head, which was the symbol of Lysimachus, and a tiny elephant. Since the elephant was the symbol of Seleucus, these coins have sometimes been connected with the short period of Seleucus' rule over the region between the battle of Corupedium and his assassination. However, Hollstein has argued that these were coins of Ptolemy Ceraunus, intended to present him as the legitimate heir of Lysimachus and in possession of a formidable force of elephants. The issue was very small; Ceraunus never issued coins in his own name.

Antigonos Gonatas, whose father Demetrius I Poliorcetes had been king of Macedon from 294-288 BC, attempted to seize control of Macedon, but Ptolemy Ceraunus defeated him in a naval battle and confined him to the city of Demetrias, Thessaly. A series of tetradrachms minted at Amphipolis (the main Macedonian mint), which feature a small Triton blowing a trumpet, have sometimes been associated with this victory, but this has been questioned, since they appear to have been minted a year after Ceraunus' death.

Ptolemy Ceraunus also made an alliance with Pyrrhus of Epirus, who had controlled the western portion of Macedon from 288-284 BC, ending the threat of attack from him. The alliance freed Pyrrhus to invade Italy to fight against the Roman Republic in the Pyrrhic War. Justin reports that Ceraunus provided Pyrrhus with a large number of troops: 5,000 infantry, 4,000 cavalry, and 50 elephants, and says that the alliance was sealed by the marriage of a daughter of Ceraunus to Pyrrhus. Some scholars have been sceptical of this report, suggesting that Justin has confused Ptolemy Ceraunus with Ptolemy II, since they doubt that Ceraunus could have spared such a large number of troops at this moment. The existence of the marriage is also disputed. If the daughter did exist, her subsequent fate is unknown.

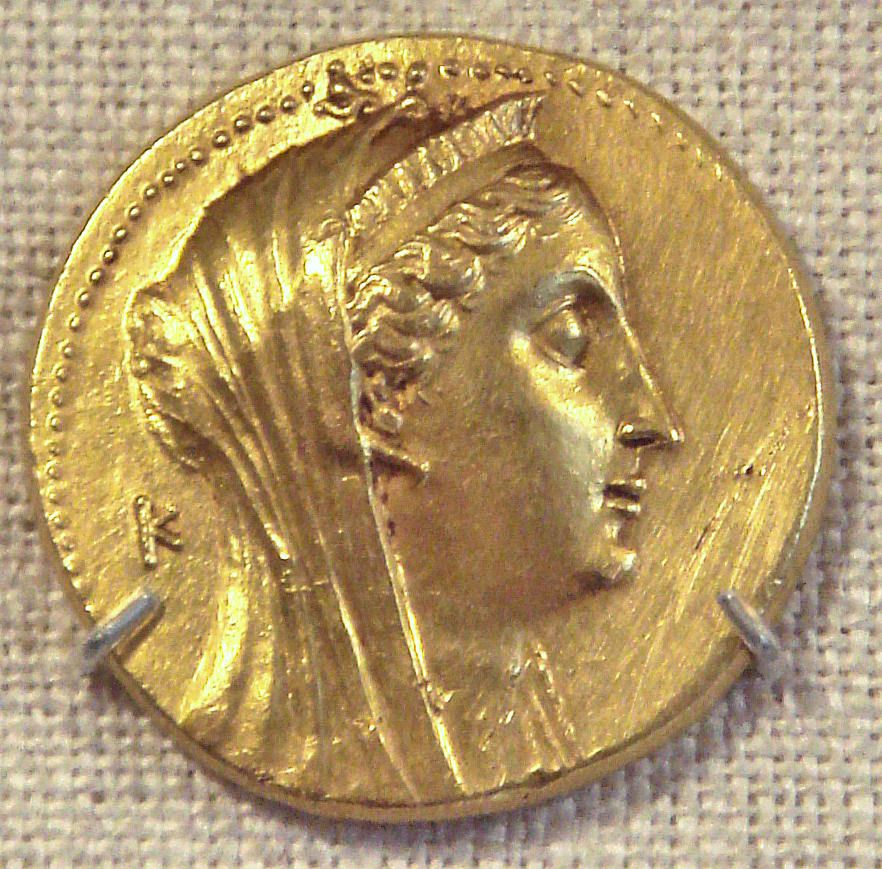
Coin of Ptolemy II, depicting Arsinoe II

Arsinoe II, the widow of Lysimachus, had fled with her young sons after Lysimachus' defeat at Corupedium to Ephesus (which had been renamed Arsinoeia in her honour). The Ephesians rioted against her, forcing her to leave the city and sail to Macedon, where she took control of the city of Cassandreia. Ptolemy Ceraunus entered into negotiations with Arsinoe II and proposed to marry her, even though she was his half-sister. She agreed on the condition that her young sons were kept safe. On their wedding day, however, Ptolemy Ceraunus murdered her two younger sons. Arsinoe fled to Samothrace and then to Egypt, where she eventually married Ptolemy II. Her eldest son, Ptolemy Epigonos fled north to the kingdom of the Dardanians.

Ptolemy Ceraunus was next attacked by a son of Lysimachus and an Illyrian king called Monunius. The son is not certainly identified by the surviving source, but Elizabeth D. Carney argues that it was Ptolemy Epigonos, the eldest son of Arsinoe by Lysimachus. Monunius may have been a king of the Dardanians who took him in after the murder of his younger brothers. This war seems to have occupied Ptolemy Ceraunus for most of 280 BC.

== Death ==
In January or February 279 BC, perhaps taking advantage of the ongoing conflict between Ptolemy Ceraunus and Ptolemy Epigonos, a group of Gauls led by Bolgius invaded Macedon from the north. Diodorus Siculus reports that the impetuous Ptolemy refused to wait for his full force to arrive before attacking Bolgius' army, while Justin reports that he rudely rebuffed diplomatic overtures from Bolgius. He also rudely refused help from a force of 20,000 Dardanians, offered by a Dardanian king. When the forces joined battle, Ceraunus was wounded and captured by the Gauls, who killed him, mounted his head on a spear, and carried it around the battlefield. When the Macedonians saw that their leader was dead, they fled. Ptolemy Ceraunus' death brought anarchy, as the Gauls streamed through the rest of Greece and into Asia Minor. Immediately after Ceraunus' death, the throne of Macedon was taken by his younger brother Meleager, but he was deposed by his troops within months. A series of short-lived kings followed. This situation lasted about two years, until Antigonos Gonatas defeated the Gauls in a battle near Lysimachia, Thrace, in 277 BC. After this victory he was recognised as king of Macedon and his power extended eventually to the rest of Greece.

== Marriages and issue ==
Ptolemy Ceraunus apparently had a daughter, who married Pyrrhus in late 281 or 280 BC. The existence of this marriage is disputed, but if it did take place, Ceraunus must have married her mother around 300-295 BC. Christopher Bennett proposes that she may have been a daughter of Lysimachus, with whom Ptolemy I contracted a number of marriage alliances in those years.

Ptolemy agreed to marry Lysimachus' widow Arsinoe II, his own half-sister, in late 281 or early 280 BC, as part of a plot to seize the city of Cassandreia and murder her children. It is unclear whether the marriage was actually consummated, but Arsinoe fled Macedon immediately after the wedding.

== Bibliography ==
- Carney, Elizabeth Donnelly (2013). Arsinoe of Egypt and Macedon: A Royal Life. Oxford University Press. pp. 31–64. ISBN 978-0-19-971101-7.
- Grainger, John D. (2010). The Syrian Wars. pp. 281–328. ISBN 9789004180505.
- Hölbl, Gūnther (2001). A History of the Ptolemaic Empire. Routledge. ISBN 978-0-06-019439-0.
- Hollstein, W. (1995). "Münzen des Ptolemaios Keraunos". Schweizerische Numismatische Rundschau. 74: 13–25.

Preceded by Lysimachus	King of Macedon; 281–279 BC	Succeeded by Meleager
