= Alcimachus (son of Alcimachus of Apollonia) =

4th-century BC Macedonian nobleman

Alcimachus, also known as Alcimachus of Apollonia (Greek: Ἀλκίμαχος, flourished 4th century BC) was an Ancient Macedonian nobleman and a relative of Lysimachus.

Alcimachus was a son of Alcimachus of Apollonia by unnamed Greek woman and had a brother called Philip. He was the namesake of his father, perhaps his paternal great, grandfather and his known grandparent was his paternal grandfather Agathocles. His father served as an official, and as an active diplomat and administrator in the latter reign of King Philip II of Macedon who reigned 359 BC–336 BC and the first years of his son, King Alexander the Great reigned 336 BC–323 BC.

Alcimachus appears to have been born and raised in Apollonia and is known from surviving inscriptional evidence. From an inscription dated from late 319 BC, reveals honors that Alcimachus received from the state. The inscription reveals he was granted similar honor to those held by his father. This honor that Alcimachus received may refer to granted property.

Another inscription found on the Greek island of Ios reveals that Alcimachus had a son called Lysippus. Lysippus was honored in this inscription as Proxenos of Ios and the inscription refers to Alcimachus’ eunoia toward the state.

== Sources ==
- Lund, Helen S. (2002). Lysimachus: A Study in Early Hellenistic Kingship. Routledge.
- Heckel, Waldemar (2006). Who's Who in the Age of Alexander the Great: Prosopography of Alexander's Empire. Wiley-Blackwell.
- O'Sullivan, Lara (2009). The Regime of Demetrius of Phalerum in Athens, 317-307 BCE: A Philosopher in Politics. Brill Academic Publishers.
