= Ma'sub inscription =

3rd-century BC Phoenician inscription

Masub inscription
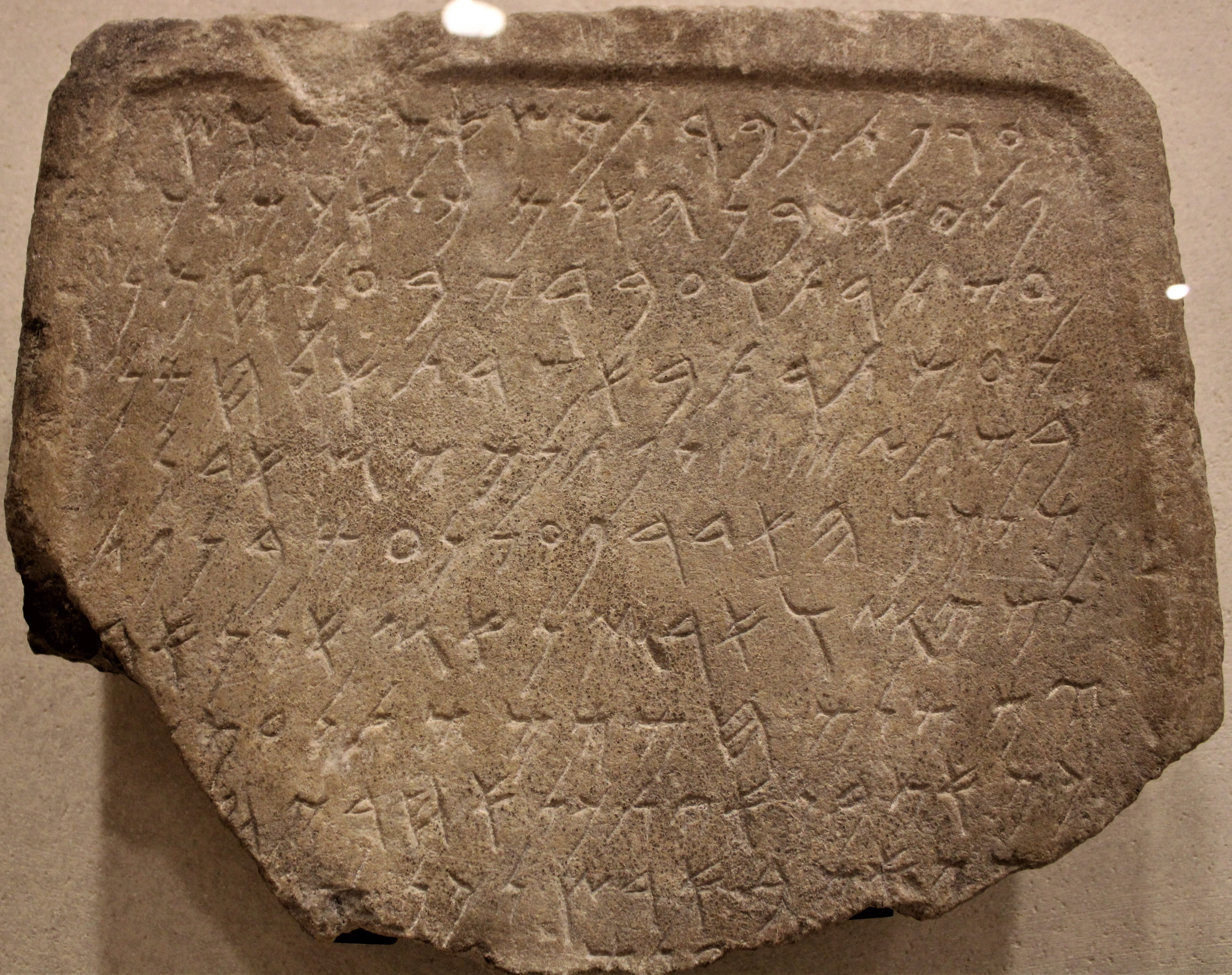
- The inscription at the Louvre
- Created: 221 BC in Umm al-Amad, Ptolemaic Kingdom
- Discovered: 1887; Northern Israel
- Present location: The Louvre
- Language: Phoenician

The Ma'sub inscription is a Phoenician-language inscription found at Khirbet Ma'sub (French: Masoub) near Al-Bassa. The inscription is from 222/21 BC. Written in Phoenician script, it is also known as KAI 19.

== Provenance ==
It is considered by the Louvre to originate from Umm al-Amad, Lebanon, around 6-7 km to the northwest of Kh. Ma'sub, on the basis of the reference to an Astarte temple in the inscription; such a temple has been excavated at the Lebanese site. This theory is contra the original provenance statement by Clermont-Ganneau and has also been recently contested by Friedman and Ecker, who see no reason to construe a new provenance and suggest that a second Astarte temple, a twin to the northern one from Umm al-Amad, was built at the southern entrance to the Ladder of Tyre pass, i.e. at or near Ma'sub, thus creating a ritual "bracket" for the pass. In Dunand and Duru's catalogue of Umm al-Amad inscriptions, it is number iv.

== Inscription ==
The inscription is given as:

‘RPT KBRT MṢ’ ŠMŠ WṢ
The great colonnade of (the side of) the sunrise, and its nor-

PLY ’Š BN H’LM ML’K MLK
-th (side), which the ʾElim (gods), the envoys of (the divine couple) Milk-

‘ŠTRT W‘BDY B‘L ḤMN
ʿAshtart and the servants of Baʿal Ḥammon (dedicated)

L‘ŠTRT B’ŠRT ’L ḤMN
to ʿAshtart, in the holy courtyard of the god Ḥammon

BŠT 20 3 3 LPTLMYS ’DN
in the 26th year of Ptolemy, lord

MLKM H’DR P‘L N‘M BN PT
of kings, (the) noble, (the) beneficent, son of Pto-

LMYS W’RSN’S ’LN ’[Ḥ]
-lemy and Arsinoë, the divine A[del]-

YM ŠLŠ ḤMŠM ŠT L‘M [ṢR]
-phoi (literally "the gods-brothers"), (in the) three-(and)-fiftieth year of the people of [Tyre],

KM’Š BN ’YT KL ’ḤRY [HMQ]
as also they built all of the other tem-

[DŠ]M ’Š B’RṢ LKN LM L[SKR]
-ples which are in the land, to be to them for [memory]

[WŠM N‘M ‘D] ‘LM
[and good name for] eternity.
