= Eurydice (disambiguation) =

In Greek mythology, Eurydice is the wife of the musician Orpheus.

Eurydice or Euridice may also refer to:

== People ==
- Eurydice, wife of Amyntas I of Macedon and mother of Alexander I of Macedon
- Eurydice I of Macedon, mother of the king of Macedonia, Philip II
- Eurydice II of Macedon (died 317 BC), wife of the nominal king of Macedonia, Philip Arrhidaeus
- Eurydice of Egypt, wife of Ptolemy I Soter, king of Egypt
- Cleopatra Eurydice of Macedon, wife of Philip II of Macedon
- Eurydice (wife of Antipater II of Macedon), daughter of Lysimachus and Nicaea
- Eurydice of Athens, one of the wives of Demetrius I Poliorcetes
- Eurydice Dixon (1995–2018), Australian comedian and actress murdered in a Melbourne park

== Mythological figures ==
- Eurydice (mythology), various other figures in Greek mythology

== Arts and entertainment ==
- Eurydice (Mallet play) a 1731 tragedy by David Mallet
- Eurydice (Anouilh play), a 1941 play by Jean Anouilh
- Eurydice (Ruhl play), a 2003 play by Sarah Ruhl
- Euridice (Caccini), a 1602 opera by Giulio Caccini
- Euridice (Peri), a 1600 opera by Jacopo Peri
- Eurydice (Aucoin), a 2020 opera by Matthew Aucoin
- Eurydice, a modern poem by Carol Ann Duffy
- Eurydice, a poem by Harryette Mullen
- Eurydice, a painting by Ludwig Löfftz
- "Eurydice", a song by Sleepthief with vocals by Jody Quine
- "Eurydice", a song from the 1971 album Weather Report
- "Eurydice", a song by The Crüxshadows
- Eurydice or Patsy Stone, a character in the UK television series Absolutely Fabulous
- Eurydice (Hades), a character in the 2020 video game Hades

== Ships ==
- HMS Eurydice (1781), a post ship which was broken up in 1834
- HMS Eurydice (1843), a post ship, later a training ship which foundered in 1878
- French submarine Eurydice (Q130), an Ariane-class submarine which was scuttled in 1942
- French submarine Eurydice (S644), launched in 1962 and lost in 1970
- Eurydice (1797 ship), primarily a West Indiaman

== Other uses ==
- Eurydice (crustacean), a genus of isopod crustaceans
- Eurydice (magazine), Greek language magazine in the Ottoman Empire
- Eurydice Network, the Information Network on Education in Europe
- Eurydice Peninsula, Antarctica
- 75 Eurydike, an asteroid
- Ctenotus eurydice, a species of lizard
- Gerrhopilus eurydice, a species of snake
