= Adeia =

Greek noblewoman, circa 300 BCE

Adeia also known as Adaea (fl. 4th – 3rd centuries BCE) was a Greek noblewoman. She was the wife of Autodicus, one of the four Somatophylakes for the Greek Macedonian King Philip III Arrhidaeus who reigned 323 BC-317 BC. One of Autodicus’ brothers was Lysimachus one of the Diadochi of Alexander the Great.

Adeia was a woman from obscure origins and she is only known from surviving archaeological evidence. In the reign of her brother-in-law Lysimachus who ruled from 306 BC-281 BC as King over Thrace, Anatolia and Macedonia; Adeia, Autodicus and their family were prominent figures in Lysimachus’ Thracian court and were among those who stayed loyal to Lysimachus. Adeia bore Autodicus children; however the identities of their children are unknown.

At an unknown date in Lysimachus’ rule, he dedicated a statue of Adeia in the sanctuary of the Amphiaraon at Oropus. The statue is now unfortunately lost. This statue may have been dated to the last years of Lysimachus’ life and Lysimachus dedicated the statue of Adeia in the recognition of her Arete and Eunoia.

== Sources ==
- Lysimachus’ article at Livius.org
- H.S. Lund, Lysimachus: A Study in Early Hellenistic Kingship, Routledge, 2002
- W. Heckel, Who’s who in the age of Alexander the Great: prosopography of Alexander’s empire, Wiley-Blackwell, 2006
