= Lysimachus of Egypt =

Lysimachus
- Born: 3rd c. BC
- Died: 3rd c. BC
- Greek: Λυσίμαχος
- House: Ptolemaic dynasty
- Father: Ptolemy II Philadelphus
- Mother: Arsinoe I of Lysimachids

Lysimachus (Greek: Λυσίμαχoς; fl. 3rd century BC) was a son of king Ptolemy Philadelphus (283–246 BC) by Arsinoe, the daughter of Lysimachus, king of Thrace. He survived both his brother Ptolemy III Euergetes (246–221 BC) and his nephew Magas of Egypt (241–221 BC), but was not much later put to death by Sosibius, the minister and guardian of Ptolemy IV Philopator (221–204 BC).
