= Lysimachus =

Macedonian officer of Thessalian origin (c. 360–281 BCE)

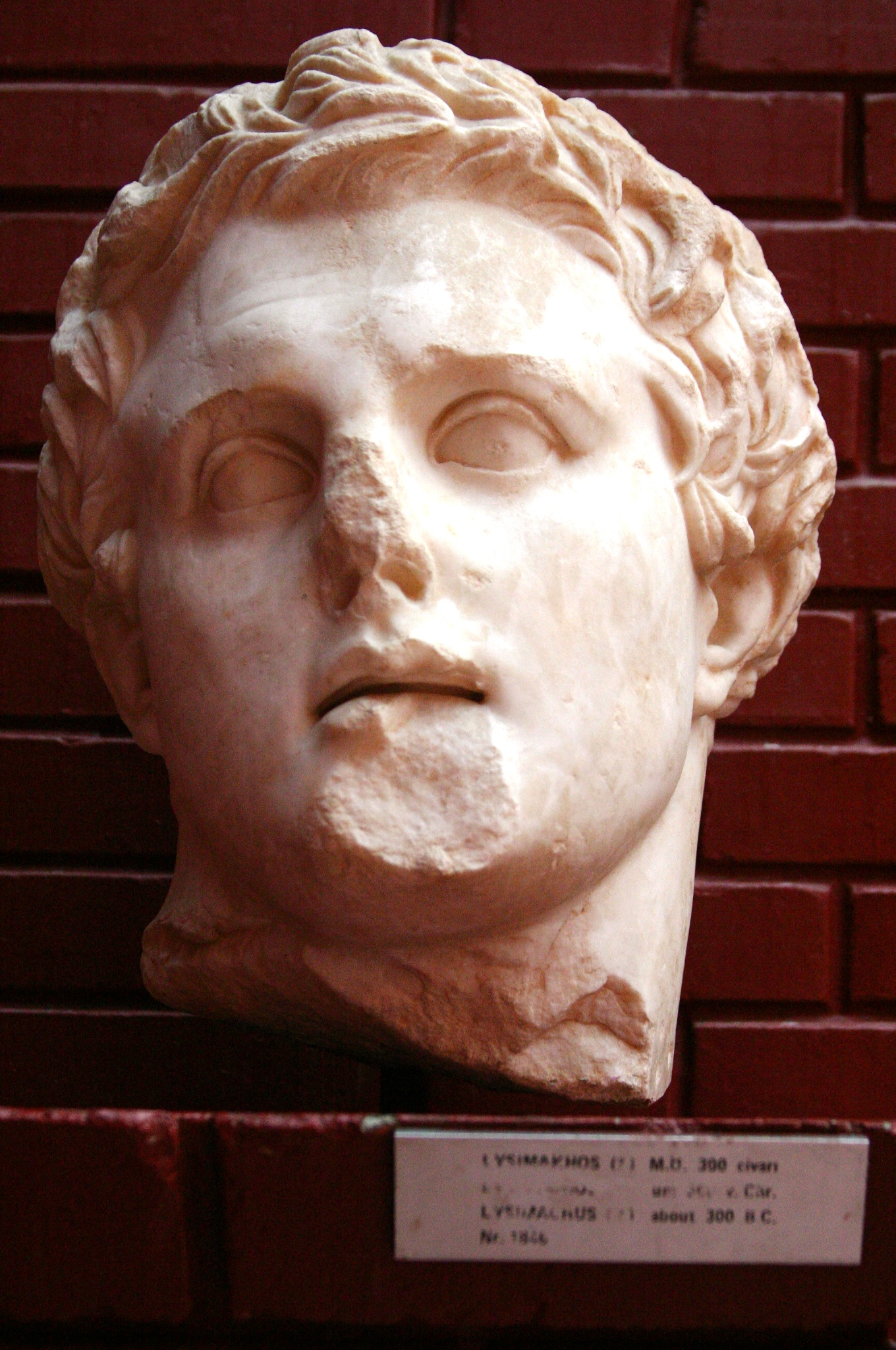
- Hellenistic marble bust of Lysimachus at the Ephesus Archaeological Museum, dated circa 300 BC.

King of Thrace
- Reign: 306–281 BC
- Predecessor: Alexander IV
- Successor: Ptolemy Keraunos

King of Asia Minor
- Reign: 301–281 BC
- Predecessor: Antigonus I Monophthalmus
- Successor: Seleucus I Nicator

King of Macedon with Pyrrhus of Epirus
- Reign: 288–281 BC
- Predecessor: Demetrius I Poliorcetes
- Successor: Ptolemy Keraunos
- Born: c. 360 BC; Crannon or Pella
- Died: February 281 BC (aged 78–79); Corupedium, near Sardis (modern-day Salihli, Manisa, Turkey)
- Burial: Lysimachia, Thrace (modern-day Kavakköy, Çanakkale, Turkey)
- Consort: Nicaea; Amastris; Arsinoe II
- Issue Among others: Agathocles; Ptolemy; Alexander; Arsinoe
- Father: Agathocles
- Military career
- Conflicts: Wars of the Diadochi; Fourth War of the Diadochi; Battle of Ipsus; Campaign of the Chersonese; The Struggle over Macedon; The Struggle between Lysimachus and Seleucus; Battle of Corupedium †

Lysimachus (/lɪˈsɪməkəs/; Greek: Λυσίμαχος, Lysimachos; c. 360 BC – 281 BC) was a Thessalian officer and successor of Alexander the Great who became king of Thrace in 306 BC, western Asia Minor in 301 BC and Macedon in 288 BC.

Born into a Thessalian noble family, Lysimachus was one of Alexander's immediate bodyguards and accompanied him in his Persian and Indian campaigns. After Alexander's death in 323 BC, he was appointed strategos of Thrace. Afterwards, he joined a coalition against Antigonus, who was ultimately defeated and killed at the Battle of Ipsus in 301 BC. Antigonus's lands were divided among the victors, with Lysimachus acquiring Lydia, Ionia, Phrygia and northern Asia Minor. Later, he joined forces with Pyrrhus of Epirus to expel Antigonus's son Demetrius from Macedonia, before seizing Macedonia for himself.

The final years of Lysimachus's life were beset by domestic troubles. In 284 BC, urged by his third wife Arsinoe II, who sought to position her own son as successor, Lysimachus had his eldest son Agathocles executed on the charge of treason. The deeply unpopular act prompted widespread rebellion, and Seleucus seized the opportunity and invaded Asia Minor. In 281 BC, Lysimachus met Seleucus at the Battle of Corupedium, where he was defeated and killed.

== Early life and career ==
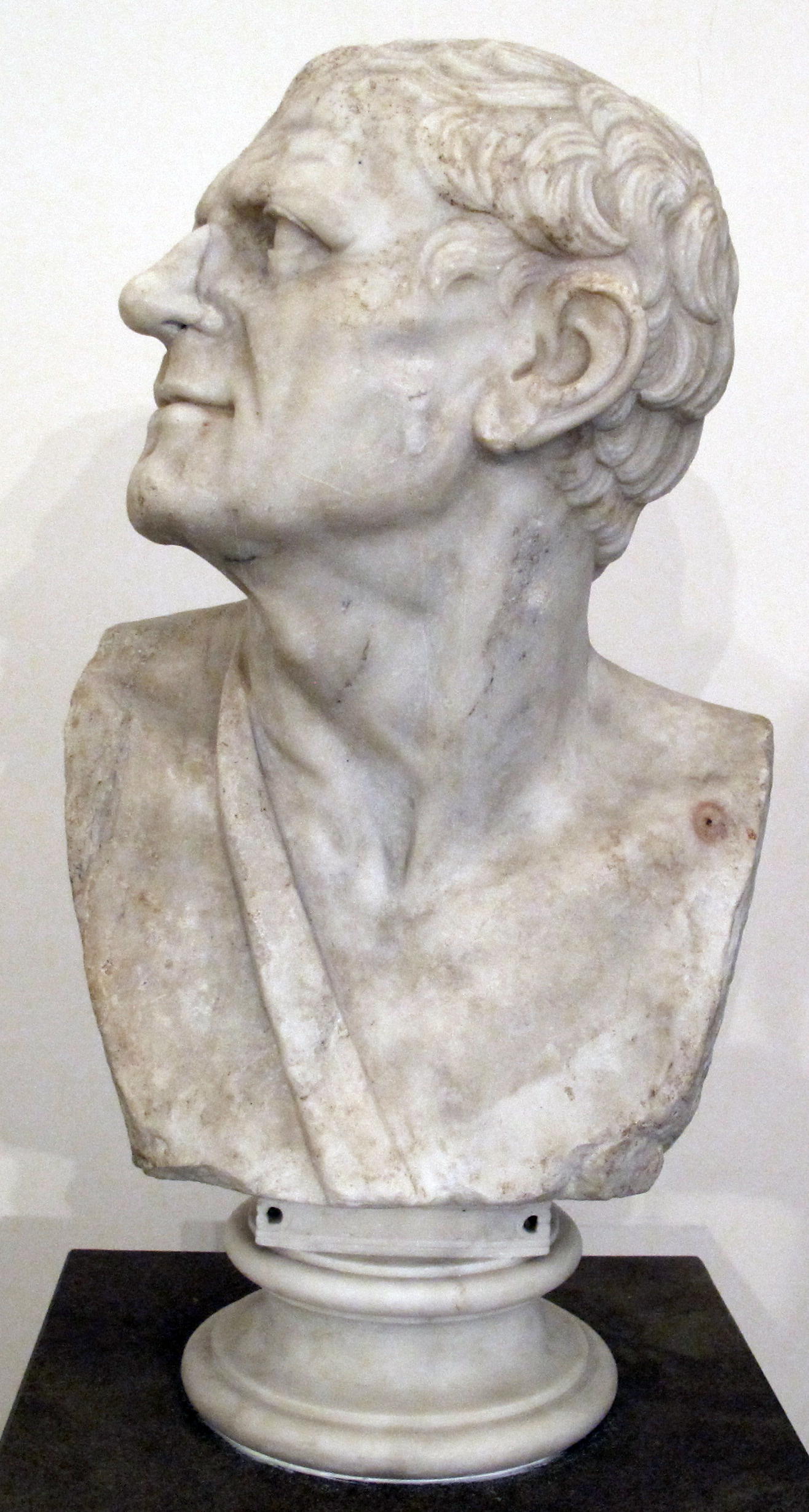
A marble bust of Lysimachus, an Augustan Roman era copy of a Hellenistic Greek original dated to the 2nd century BC, National Archaeological Museum, Naples

Lysimachus was born circa 360 BC, to a family of Thessalian stock but they were citizens of Pella in Macedonia. He was the second son of Agathocles and his wife; there is some indication in the historical sources that this wife was perhaps named Arsinoe, and that Lysimachus's paternal grandfather may have been called Alcimachus. His father was a nobleman of high rank who was an intimate friend of Philip II of Macedon, shared in Philip II’s councils and became a favourite in the Argead court. Lysimachus and his brothers grew up with the status of Macedonians; all these brothers enjoyed with Lysimachus prominent positions in Alexander’s circle and, like him, were educated at the Macedonian court in Pella. Lysimachus had an elder brother, Alcimachus of Apollonia, and two younger brothers, Autodicus and Philip. He had two known nephews through his brother Alcimachus, Alcimachus and Philip; his known great-nephew was Lysippus, the grandson of his brother Alcimachus and his known sister-in-law was Adeia, the wife of Autodicus.

Pausanias and the historian Justin both record a story that Alexander had Lysimachus thrown to a lion as a punishment. According to Justin, this was because Lysimachus had smuggled poison to a person Alexander had condemned to a slow death. Both Pausanias and Justin report that Lysimachus overcame the lion with his bare hands and subsequently became one of Alexander's favorites. Some coins issued during Lysimachus's appointment had his image on one side and a lion on the other.

He was probably appointed Somatophylax during the reign of Philip II. During Alexander's Persian campaigns, in 328 BC he was one of his immediate bodyguards. In 324 BC, in Susa, he was awarded a ceremonial crown in recognition of his actions in India. After Alexander's death in 323 BC, he was appointed to the government of Thrace as strategos, although he faced some difficulties from the Thracian king Seuthes III.

== Diadochi ==
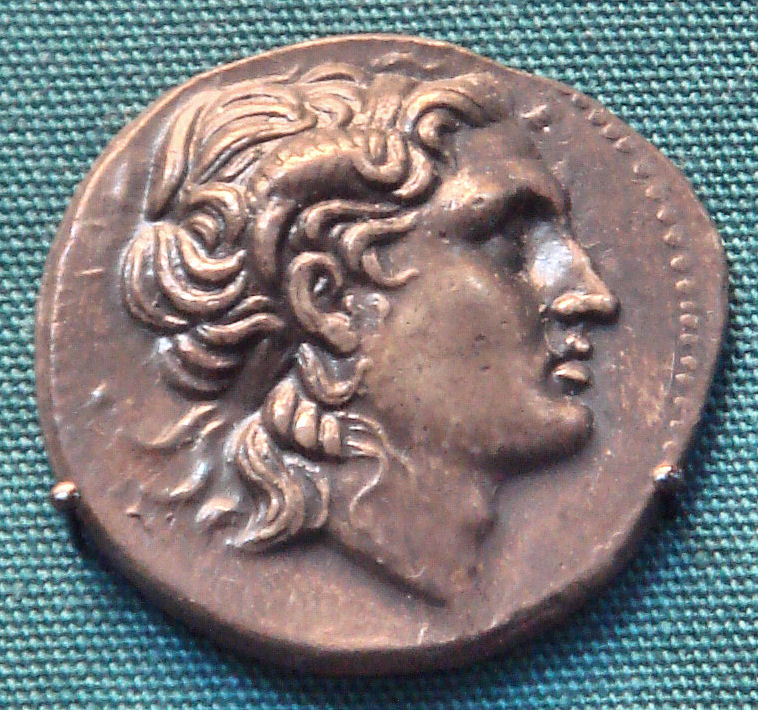
Obverse of coin of Lysimachus: The horned Alexander appears as the king's divine patron.

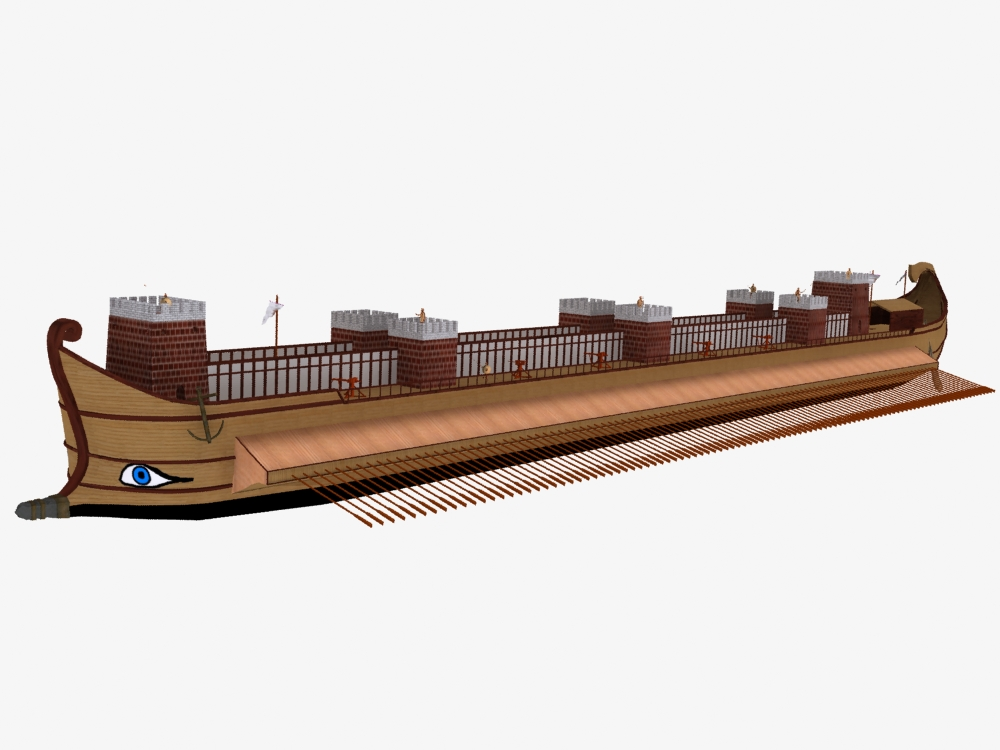
Fanciful digital reconstruction of Leontophoros

In 315 BC, Lysimachus joined Cassander, Ptolemy and Seleucus against Antigonus, who, however, diverted his attention by stirring up Thracian and Scythian tribes against him. However, he managed to consolidate his power in the east of his territories, suppressing a revolt of the cities on the Black Sea coast.

In 309 BC, he founded Lysimachia in a commanding situation on the neck connecting the Chersonese with the mainland, forming a bulwark against the Odrysians.

In 306/305 BC, Lysimachus followed the example of Antigonus and assumed the royal title.

In 302 BC, when the second alliance between Cassander, Ptolemy and Seleucus was made, Lysimachus, reinforced by troops from Cassander, entered Asia Minor, where he met with little resistance. On the approach of Antigonus, he retired into winter quarters near Heraclea, marrying its widowed queen Amastris, a Persian princess. Seleucus joined him in 301 BC and, at the Battle of Ipsus, Antigonus was defeated and slain. Antigonus's dominions were divided among the victors. Lysimachus's share was Lydia, Ionia, Phrygia and the north coast of Asia Minor.

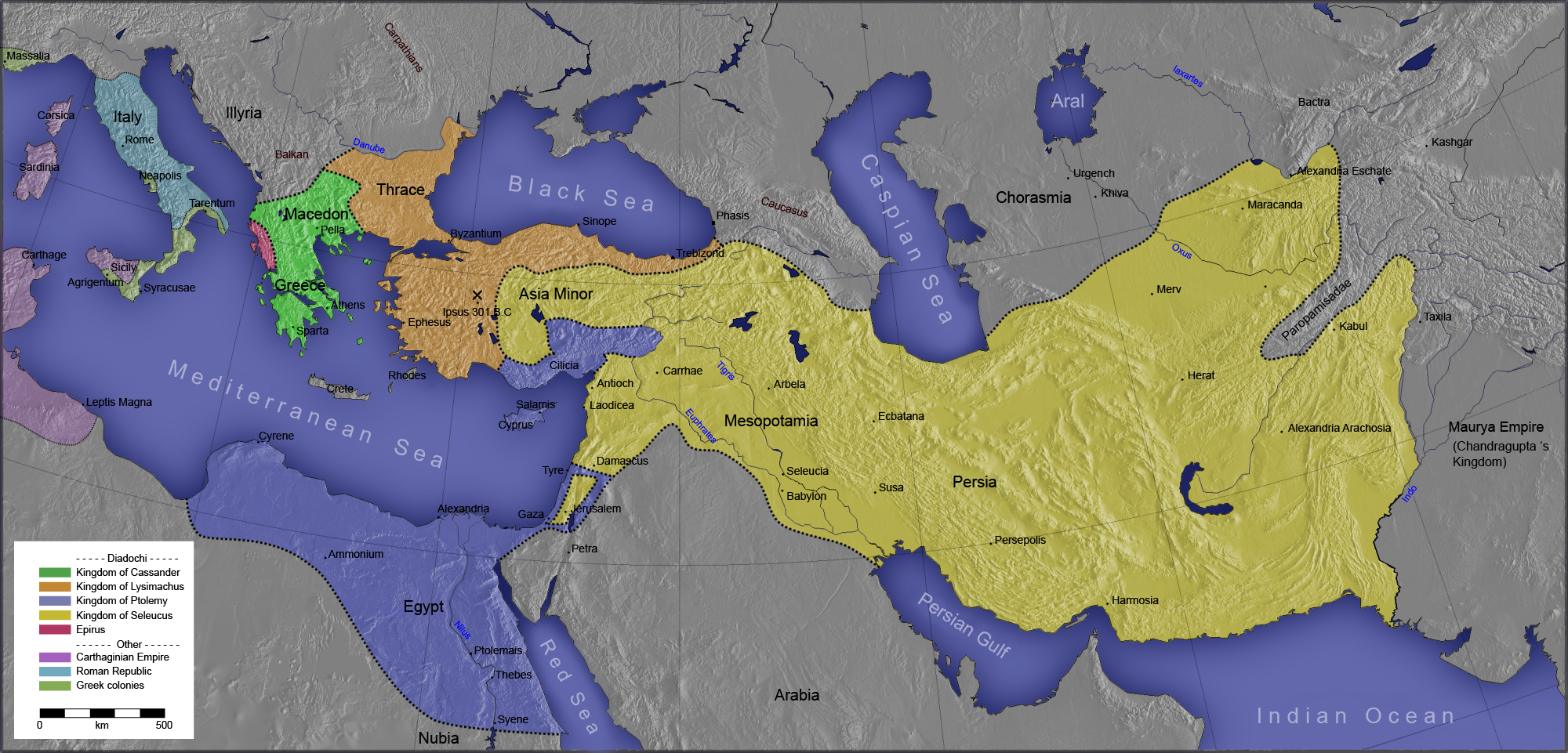
Kingdom of Lysimachus Other diadochi Kingdom of Cassander Kingdom of Seleucus I Nicator Kingdom of Ptolemy I Soter Epirus Other Carthage Rome Greek colonies

Feeling that Seleucus was becoming dangerously powerful, Lysimachus now allied himself with Ptolemy, marrying his daughter Arsinoe II of Egypt. Amastris, who had divorced herself from him, returned to Heraclea. When Antigonus's son Demetrius I renewed hostilities (297 BC), during his absence in Greece, Lysimachus seized his towns in Asia Minor, but in 294 BC concluded a peace whereby Demetrius was recognized as ruler of Macedonia. He tried to carry his power beyond the Danube, but was defeated and taken prisoner by the Getae king Dromichaetes (or Dromihete), who, however, set him free in 292 BC on amicable terms in return for Lysimachus surrendering the Danubian lands he had captured. Demetrius subsequently threatened Thrace, but had to retire due to a sudden uprising in Boeotia and an attack from King Pyrrhus of Epirus.

In 287 BC, Lysimachus and Pyrrhus in turn invaded Macedonia and drove Demetrius out of the country. Lysimachus left Pyrrhus in possession of Macedonia with the title of king for around seven months before Lysimachus invaded. For a short while, the two ruled jointly but, in 285 BC, Lysimachus expelled Pyrrhus, seizing complete control for himself.

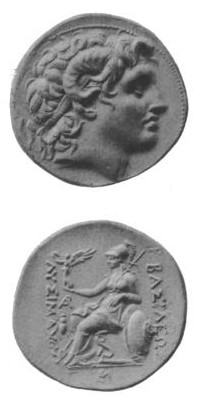
Tetradrachm of Lysimachus. The Greek inscription reads: ΒΑΣΙΛΕΩΣ ΛΥΣΙΜΑΧΟΥ "[coin] of King Lysimachus".

== Later years ==
Domestic troubles embittered the last years of Lysimachus’s life. Amastris had been murdered by her two sons; Lysimachus treacherously put them to death. On his return, Arsinoe II asked the gift of Heraclea, and he granted her request, though he had promised to free the city. In 284 BC, Arsinoe, desirous of gaining the succession for her sons in preference to Lysimachus’s first child, Agathocles, intrigued against him with the help of Arsinoe's paternal half-brother Ptolemy Keraunos; they accused him of conspiring with Seleucus to seize the throne, and Agathocles was put to death.

This atrocious deed by Lysimachus aroused great indignation. Many of the cities of Asia Minor revolted, and his most trusted friends deserted him. The widow of Agathocles and their children fled to Seleucus, who at once invaded the territory of Lysimachus in Asia Minor. In 281 BC, Lysimachus crossed the Hellespont into Lydia and at the decisive Battle of Corupedium was killed. After some days, his body was found on the field, protected from birds of prey by his faithful dog. Lysimachus's body was given over to another son, Alexander, by whom it was interred at Lysimachia.

== Marriages and children ==
Lysimachus was married three times; his wives were:

- First marriage: Nicaea, a Greek (Macedonian) noblewoman and daughter of the powerful regent Antipater. Lysimachus and Nicaea married in c. 321 BC. Nicaea bore Lysimachus three children:
  - Son, Agathocles
  - Daughter, Eurydice
  - Daughter, Arsinoe I

Nicaea most probably died by 302 BC.

- Second marriage: Persian Princess Amastris. Lysimachus married her in 302 BC. Amastris and Lysimachus’s union was brief, as he ended their marriage and divorced her in 300/299 BC.
- Third marriage: Ptolemaic Greek Princess Arsinoe II. Arsinoe II married Lysimachus in 300/299 BC and remained with him until his death in 281 BC. Arsinoe II bore Lysimachus three sons:
  - Ptolemy I Epigonos
  - Lysimachus
  - Philip

From an Odrysian concubine he had a son, Alexander.

== Family tree of Lysimachids ==
Alcimachus
Agathocles of Pella counselor ∞ Arsinoe
Alcimachus of Apollonia diplomat	1.Nicaea of Macedon daughter of Antipater regent of Macedon	Lysimachus king of Thrace, Asia; Minor, Macedonia ∞ 2.Amastrine	3.Arsinoe II daughter of Ptolemy I of Egypt	Autodicus somatophylax ∞ Adeia	Philip soldier
Alcimachus nobleman	(1) Eurydice ∞ Antipater I of Macedon	(1) Agathocles prince ∞ Lysandra (daughter of Ptolemy I of Egypt)	(1) Arsinoe I ∞ Ptolemy II of Egypt	(3) Ptolemy I Epigonus king of Telmessos	(3) Lysimachus prince	(3) Philip prince	(illeg.); Alexander
Lysimachus king of Telmessos	Epigonos prince
Ptolemy II king of Telmessos	Antipater Epigonos prince
Berenice priestess

== See also ==
- Belevi Mausoleum
- Lysimachia (Thrace)
- Lysimachia (Aetolia)
- Lake Lysimachia

== Additional bibliography ==
=== Primary sources ===
- Arrian. Anabasis v. 13, vi. 28
- Justin xv. 3, 4, xvii. I
- Quintus Curtius Rufus. History of Alexander the Great V. 3, x. 30
- Diodorus Siculus. Bibliotheke xviii. 3
- Polybius. Histories v. 67
- Plutarch. Life of Demetrius, 31. 52, Life of Pyrrhus, 12
- Appian. Syriaca, 62

=== Secondary sources ===
- Hunerwadel (1900). Forschungen zur Gesch. des Könige Lysimachus (in German).
- Possenti (1901). Il Re Lisimaco di Tracia (in Italian).
- Ghione (1903). "Note sul regno di Lisimaco". Atti d. real. Accad. di Torino (in Italian). p. xxxix.
- Lysimachus at Livius.org
- Ptolemaic Genealogy: Ptolemy Ceraunus
- Ptolemaic Genealogy: Unknown wife of Ptolemy Ceraunus
- Ptolemaic Genealogy: Ptolemy ‘the Son’

Preceded by New creation	Governor of Thrace; 323–306 BC	Succeeded by Merged into kingship
Preceded by Alexander IV	King of Thrace; 306–281 BC	Succeeded by Ptolemy Keraunos
Preceded by Antigonus I Monophthalmus	King of Asia Minor; 301–281 BC	Succeeded by Seleucus I Nicator
Preceded by Demetrius I Poliorcetes	King of Macedon; 288–281 BC; With: Pyrrhus of Epirus	Succeeded by Ptolemy Keraunos
