= Dromichaetes =

Dromichaetes - Δρομιχαίτης
- King of Getae
- Reign: c. 300 – c. 280 BC
- Died: c. 280 BC
- Burial: Sveshtari, Bulgaria
- Spouse: a daughter of Lysimachus

Dromichaetes (Ancient Greek: Δρομιχαίτης, romanized: Dromichaites) was king of the Getae on both sides of the lower Danube (present day Romania and Bulgaria) around 300 BC.

== Background ==
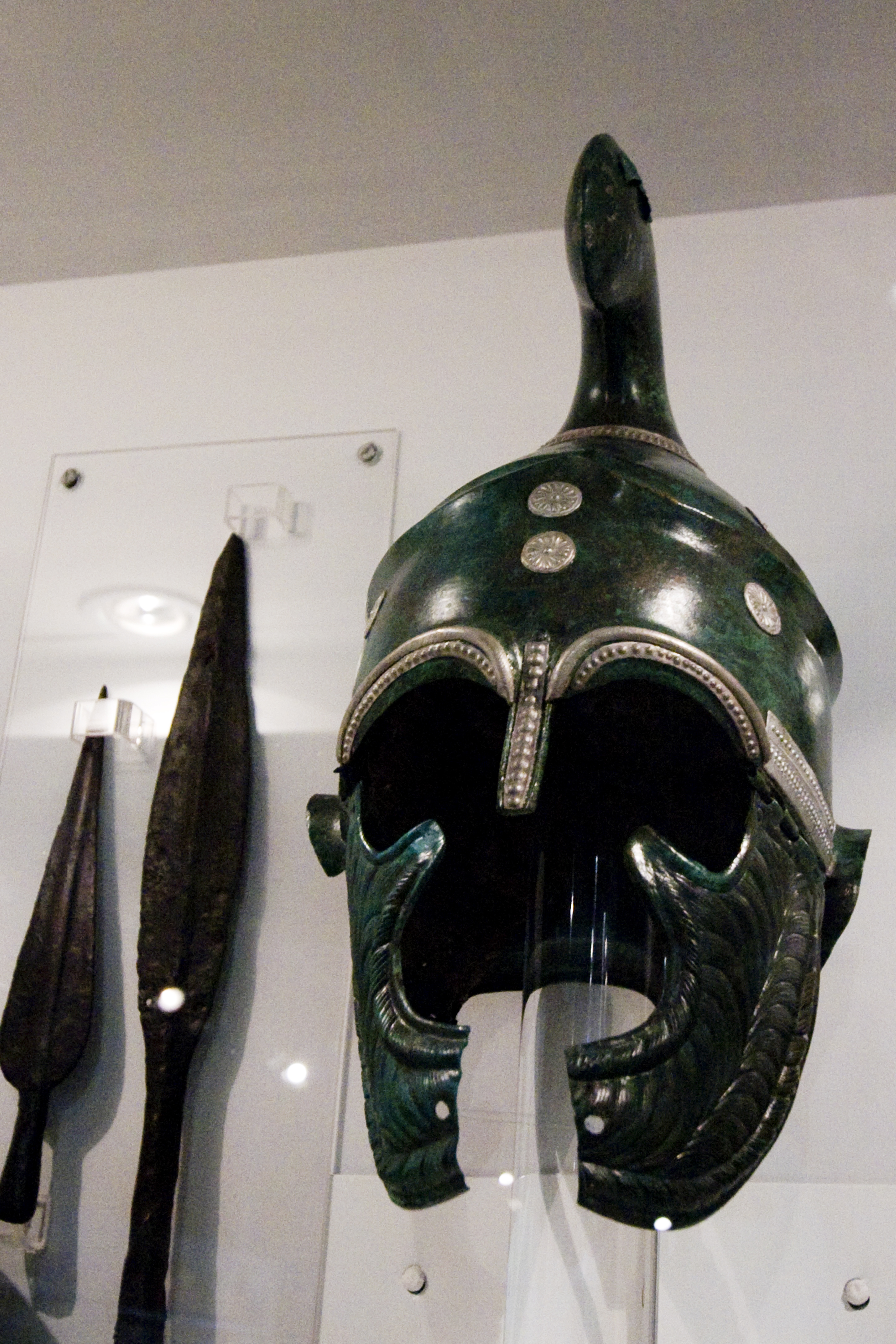
Thracian helmet with decorations made from bronze and silver. Dated mid-4th century BC.

The Getae had been federated in the Odrysian kingdom in the 5th century BC. It is not known how the relations between Getae and Odrysians developed. The Balkan campaigns of Philip II of Macedon between 352 and 340 BC shattered Odrysian authority and the Getae profited from the situation. By the second half of the 4th century, the Getae occupied sites on both banks of the lower Danube and this region flourished as never before. The new Macedonian conquests, secured with considerable military power, caused consternation in the adjoining territories and thus stimulated the political fusion of the Getic tribes.

== Name ==
There is no consensus on the etymology of the name Δρομιχαίτης (Dromichaites). It can be a Greek name (δρόμος "run" + χαιτήεις "long-haired"), a Thracian name, or a Thracian name formed with Greek elements (Δρομο- and Χαιτο-, -χαιτης).

Other people with this name include:

- a Thracian mercenary soldier in Attica around 300 BC;
- a Thracian chief helping Antiochus II Theos (261 – 246 BC) at the siege of Kypsela;
- a general of Mithridates VI Eupator sent with reinforcements in 87 BC to support Archelaus in Athens.

== Reign ==
Not much is known about the reign of Dromichaetes, his court and his kingdom. The most detailed account is provided by two fragments from the history of Diodorus Siculus. But this source must be treated with caution, as the interference of literary motifs lessens its value as historical evidence.

=== Helis ===
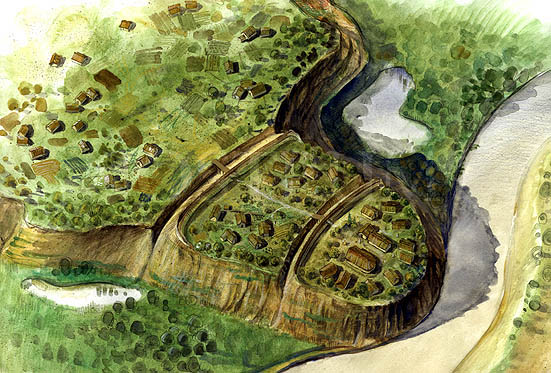
Pictorial reconstruction of the fortified settlement discovered at Popeşti, Giurgiu County, Muntenia (southern Romania).

According to Diodorus, the main residence of Dromichaetes was named Helis. Traditionally, Helis and the kingdom of Dromichaetes have been placed beyond the Danube, in the Romanian Plain. Thus Helis was variously located at Piscul Crăsani on Ialomița River, at Popeşti on Argeş River, at Zimnicea on the left bank of Danube, or identified with one of the several earth-walled fortifications from the Alexandria-Roşiorii de Vede complex. It was also suggested Helis was located in the Moldavian Plateau in a cluster of fortified settlements dated to between the 6th and the 3rd century BC, where two royal treasures were also found at Cucuteni Băiceni and Stânceşti.

The Getic tomb at Sveshtari (discovered in 1982) in the western Ludogorie in Bulgaria is also supposed to have been near the location of Helis. In the vicinity of the mausoleum, the remains of a large ancient city were found along with dozens of Getic mound tombs. The settlement is situated in a natural stronghold, a plateau surrounded like a peninsula by the ravines of Krapinets River. The outer stone wall, up to 4m thick, follows the edges of the peninsula and defends a territory of about 10 hectares. The inner wall, of similar construction, encloses a roughly quadrilateral area of about 5 hectares. The fortified territory was relatively densely occupied by dwellings connected by a network of thoroughfares. Dating finds such as amphorae stamps and coins indicate that this settlement existed between c. 335 and c. 250 BC.

The settlement enjoyed economic prosperity and sustained active trade relations with the Greek colonies in the Aegean and the Black Sea region. Imported goods were found in abundance: Attic black-glazed ceramics, amphorae from Thassos, Sinope and Heraclea Pontica and pottery of probably West-Pontic colonial origin. It was also an important production centre with metalworking, bone and pottery workshops.

== The war with Lysimachus ==
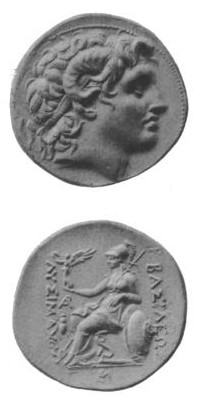
Coin of Lysimachus.

In 313 BC, during the Third War of the Diadochi, the Greek colonies of the western Black Sea shores revolted against Lysimachus, a former general of Alexander the Great, and expelled the military garrisons imposed by him. Lysimachus besieged successively Odessus and Histria and forced them to capitulate. A peace treaty was drawn up in 311, but the siege of Callatis continued until 310 or 309 BC. No other action of Lysimachus is known north of Haemus until the clash with Dromichaetes in the 290s BC.

The evidence for the conflict is incomplete and contradictory, although attested by a number of ancient authors. It was probably provoked by the territorial expansion of Lysimachus and the control of the Greek colonies was perhaps the issue at stake.

The two fragments of Diodorus' history suggest two separate campaigns. During the first the Getae captured Agathocles, the son of Lysimachus, but later set him free hoping to recover the territories lost to Lysimachus. During the second Lysimachus himself was taken prisoner and then released under similar conditions. However Pausanias, mentioning the same two episodes, implies they are parallel versions of one and the same event.

The campaign in which Lysimachus fell captive to the Getae is dated by scholars variously between 294 and 291 BC. Lysimachus invaded with significant forces and his offensive enjoyed some early success before ending in disaster. According to Polyaenus, Seuthes, a general of Dromichaetes, presented himself as a deserter, deceived Lysimachus and led him into difficult terrain. Attacked by Dromichaetes, the army of Lysimachus was defeated and the king had to surrender.

Diodorus gives our only account of the captivity and subsequent release of Lysimachus. Dromichaetes succeeded in persuading the assembly of his compatriots that the release of the enemy king would bring them greater political advantage than his punishment. Dromichaetes also set out a feast to demonstrate the barbarian ways and the poverty of his people, using different furniture, tableware and food. He then asked Lysimachus:

Why then, forsaking such ways, a splendid manner of life, and a more glorious kingdom as well, did you desire to come among men who are barbarous and lead a bestial existence, and to a wintry land deficient in cultivated grains and fruit? Why did you force a way against nature to bring an army into such a place as this, where no foreign force can survive in the open?

— Diodorus Siculus, Library of History, book XXI, chapter 12

Dromichaetes crowned Lysimachus with a wreath and then set him free, after receiving promises of loyalty and friendship and the return of the Getic territories occupied by Lysimachus. As precaution, the Getae held some high-born hostages like Clearchus, the son of the tyrant Dionysius of Heraclea. Lysimachus also had to give his daughter in marriage to Dromichaetes.

=== Death and burial ===
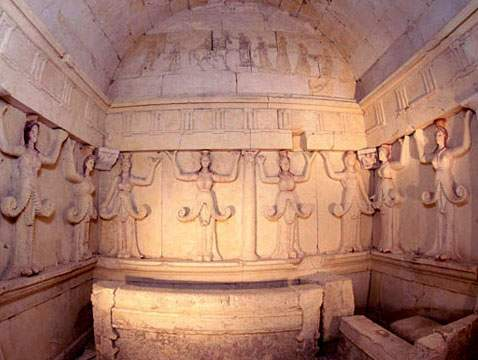
The main burial chamber of the Thracian tomb of Sveshtari in northeast Bulgaria.

The great tomb in Ginina mound near Sveshtari is among the most prominent Thracian tombs with its unique architecture and luxurious decoration. It is dated approximately to the early 3rd century BC. A painted scene, interpreted as either one of heroization or investiture, points to its probable royal character. The man and the woman buried here were tentatively identified with Dromichaetes and his consort. The unfinished details of its sculptured and painted decoration indicate a hasty and premature burial. The woman was probably murdered to accompany her royal husband in the grave.

The Roman historian Justin mentions a large army of Celts defeating both Triballi and Getae before attacking Antigonus Gonatas in 279 BC. Based on this account, Peter Delev argued that Dromichaetes could have fallen in battle against these Celts.

== Legacy ==
=== Classical world ===
The captivity of Lysimachus was echoed in the Classical Greek literature as a moralizing story about the punishment of pride and the virtues of barbarians. Diodorus' story of Dromichaetes' banquet for his royal prisoner is probably a literary device, contrasting Macedonian opulence with Thracian frugality.

=== Modern world ===
Dromichaetes is the king of Dacians and the main character in Muntele ("The Mountain"), a play written in 1977 by Dumitru Radu Popescu and a political fable. The identity between the ruler and its people alludes to Ceauşescu's cult of personality.

Helis Nunatak on Livingston Island in the South Shetland Islands, Antarctica is named after the Getic Helis.

== See also ==
- List of rulers in Thrace and Dacia
- List of ancient cities in Thrace and Dacia
