= Philip (son of Agathocles of Pella) =

4th-century BC Macedonian nobleman and soldier

Philip (Greek: Φίλιππος, died about 328 BC) was a Macedonian soldier under Alexander the Great.

Philip was the youngest of four sons born to Agathocles and his wife, possibly named Arsinoe. His paternal grandfather may have been called Alcimachus and one of his brothers was Lysimachus, one of the Diadochi of Alexander the Great.

His father was a nobleman of high rank who was a close friend and advisor of King Philip II of Macedon and became a favourite in the Argead court. Philip and his brothers grew up being regarded as Macedonians. Philip and his brothers enjoyed prominent positions in King Alexander the Great’s circle and they were educated at the court at Pella.

Philip and his brothers served as a royal Hypaspists in the service of Alexander. Not long after the death of Cleitus the Black, Philip accompanied Alexander on foot, refusing the mount of Lysimachus’ horse who rode nearby. He remained near Alexander’s side, both in the pursuit of the supporters of Spitamenes, his Sogdian rebels and their cavalry. Philip finally collapsed from exhaustion and died in Alexander’s arms. In his military actions, Philip was trying to emulate his second eldest brother, Lysimachus.

== Sources ==
- Lysimachus’ article at Livius.org
- H.S. Lund, Lysimachus: A Study in Early Hellenistic Kingship, Routledge, 2002
- W. Heckel, Who’s who in the age of Alexander the Great: prosopography of Alexander’s empire, Wiley-Blackwell, 2006
