= Kavakköy =

- Municipality
- Location in Turkey Kavakköy (Marmara)
- Coordinates: 40°36′N 26°53′E
- Country: Turkey
- Province: Çanakkale
- District: Gelibolu
- Elevation: 30 m (100 ft)
- Population (2021): 1,865
- Time zone: UTC+3 (TRT)
- Postal code: 17340
- Area code: 0286

Kavakköy (Greek: Λευκή/Λυσιμάχεια) is a town (belde) in the Gelibolu District, Çanakkale Province, Turkey. Its population is 1,865 (2021). It is situated in the East Thracian plains. It is close to both the Aegean Sea at the west and the Marmara Sea at the south. The distance to Gelibolu is about 35 kilometres (22 mi). The village was founded in 1865. The town is on the site of the ancient city of Lysimachia, which was founded at the end of the 4th century BC. During Ottoman era the name of the town was Seydikavak.
