= Autodicus =

4th-century BC Macedonian nobleman and official

Autodicus also known as Autodikos, Autolycus and Autolykos (early to mid-340s BC-?) was an Ancient Macedonian nobleman and official.

Autodicus was the third born of four sons to Agathocles and his wife, perhaps named Arsinoe. His paternal grandfather may have been called Alcimachus and one of his brothers was Lysimachus one of the Diadochi of Alexander the Great.

His father was a nobleman of high rank who was an intimate friend of King Philip II of Macedon, who shared in Philip II’s councils and became a favorite in the Argead court. Autodicus with his brothers grew up with the status of Macedonians; he with his brothers enjoyed prominent positions in King Alexander the Great’s circle and Autodicus with his brothers were educated at the court at Pella.

Autodicus was appointed in 321 BC as one of the four Somatophylakes at Triparadeisus for the Greek Macedonian King Philip III Arrhidaeus who reigned 323 BC-317 BC, who was a paternal half-brother of Alexander the Great.

During Lysimachus’ reign in 306–281 BC over Thrace, Anatolia and Macedonia, Autodicus and his family were prominent figures in his court and were among those who stayed loyal to Lysimachus.

According to an inscription found, Autodicus had a wife called Adeia, by whom he had children. However the identities of their children are unknown.

== Sources ==
- Lysimachus’ article at Livius.org
- H.S. Lund, Lysimachus: A Study in Early Hellenistic Kingship, Routledge, 2002
- W. Heckel, Who’s who in the age of Alexander the Great: prosopography of Alexander’s empire, Wiley-Blackwell, 2006
