= Eurydice (wife of Antipater II of Macedon) =

Greek Princess of Macedonian and Thessalian descent

Eurydice (Greek: Εὐρυδίκη) was a Greek Princess who was of Macedonian and Thessalian descent.

She was the first daughter and second child born to the diadochus who was King of Thrace, Asia Minor and Macedonia, Lysimachus from his first wife the Queen consort, Nicaea of Macedon. Eurydice had one older brother called Agathocles and a younger sister called Arsinoe. Her paternal grandfather was Agathocles of Pella a nobleman who was a contemporary of King Philip II of Macedon who reigned 359 BC-336 BC, while her maternal grandfather was the powerful Regent Antipater.

Eurydice was named in honor of her maternal aunt Eurydice of Egypt, another daughter of Antipater, who was one of the wives of the Greek Pharaoh Ptolemy I Soter. The name Eurydice, is a dynastic name of the Argead dynasty (see Eurydice-Historical women). The name also reveals her relations to the Argead dynasty as her maternal grandfather and her maternal great-uncle Cassander were distant collateral relatives to the Argead dynasty.

At an unknown date, Lysimachus renamed the city Smyrna to Eurydiceia in honor of Eurydice, an innovation that did not last long. Lysimachus issued coinage depicting Eurydice on the obverse as a veiled woman, although Eurydice never owned nor had any control of the city. Little is known on her life prior to marrying.

Lysimachus gave Eurydice in marriage to her maternal cousin Antipater I, the son of the rulers of Macedonia, Cassander and Thessalonike. Eurydice's marriage to Antipater I, thereby extended into the next generation the historical link between Thrace and Macedonia. In her life, Eurydice was a participant in the never ending conflict over control of Macedonia in the generations after the death of Alexander the Great.

Antipater I was co-King of Macedonia from 297 BC-294 BC with his brother Alexander V and through marriage, she became a Queen consort. On the death of her maternal uncle Cassander, his wife Thessalonike divided the kingdom into two: one part to be ruled by Antipater I ’s youngest brother Alexander V and his wife Lysandra and the other part to be ruled by Antipater I and Eurydice. Antipater I wanted the whole kingdom to rule for himself and had his mother killed.

Alexander V appealed to Pyrrhus and Demetrius I Poliorcetes for help and protection from his older brother. Pyrrhus did in exchange of two Upper Macedonian cantons. When Demetrius I arrived with his troops he had Alexander V murdered and drove out Antipater and Eurydice out of Macedonia. Demetrius I then made himself master of Macedonia. Eurydice and Antipater I returned to her father and his wife Arsinoe II. Lysimachus made peace with Demetrius I, which resulted in Antipater quarrelling with Lysimachus about his Macedonian inheritance and Lysimachus had put Antipater I to death. Eurydice siding with her cousin-husband was put into prison by her father and probably died there.

== Sources ==
- Ptolemaic Genealogy: Arsinoe I
- Ptolemaic Dynasty-Affiliated Lines: The Antipatrids
- Lysimachus’ article at Livius.org
- H. Bengtson, Griechische Geschichte von den Anfängen bis in die römische Kaiserzeit, C.H.Beck, 1977
- H.S. Lund, Lysimachus: A Study in Early Hellenistic Kingship, Routledge, 2002
- F. Chamoux, Hellenistic civilization, John Wiley & Sons, 2003
- W. Heckel, Who's who in the age of Alexander the Great: prosopography of Alexander's empire, Wiley-Blackwell, 2006
- M. Lightman & B. Lightman, A to Z of ancient Greek and Roman women (Google eBook), Infobase Publishing, 2007
