= Alcimachus of Apollonia =

4th-century BC Macedonian nobleman and official

Alcimachus of Apollonia (Greek: Ἀλκίμαχος, flourished 4th century BC) was a Greek nobleman who was a Macedonian who served as an official. He was an active diplomat and administrator in the latter reign of King Philip II of Macedon who reigned 359 BC–336 BC and the first years of his son, King Alexander the Great reigned 336 BC–323 BC.

Alcimachus was the first born of four sons to Agathocles and his wife, perhaps named Arsinoe. His paternal grandfather may have been called Alcimachus and one of his brothers was Lysimachus one of the Diadochi of Alexander the Great.

His father was a nobleman of high rank who was an intimate friend of Philip II, who shared in Philip II's councils and became a favorite in the Argead court. Alcimachus with his brothers grew up with the status of Macedonians; he with his brothers enjoyed prominent positions in Alexander's circle and Alcimachus with his brothers were educated at the court at Pella.

Two years after the Battle of Chaeronea in 338 BC, Alcimachus and Antipater were sent by Philip II to Athens where they were made Proxenoi of Athens where they were honored in a decree. Sometime in the reign of Philip II, Alcimachus may have been granted property in Apollonia and may have had honors bestowed upon him by Philip II. Two years later Alcimachus was in charge of an army, empowered by Alexander to ‘liberate’ the cities of Ionia and Aeolis. When Alcimachus was sent by Alexander to establish democracies in the Ionian and Aeolian cities, Alexander may have voiced some displeasure with Alcimachus’ behavior in handling affairs there, as he may have been the Alcimachus named in the Second Letter to the Chians. After Alexander's possible displeasure with Alcimachus, he is not mentioned again in the Alexander historians.

By an unnamed Greek wife, Alcimachus had two sons: Alcimachus by whom he had a grandson called Lysippus and Philip.

== Sources ==
- Lysimachus’ article at Livius.org
- H.S. Lund, Lysimachus: A Study in Early Hellenistic Kingship, Routledge, 2002
- W. Heckel, Who's who in the age of Alexander the Great: prosopography of Alexander's empire, Wiley-Blackwell, 2006
