= Autolycus (areopagite) =

4th-century BC Athenian politician

Autolycus (Ancient Greek: Αὐτόλυκος; fl. 4th century BC) was an Athenian areopagite who was accused by the orator Lycurgus on account of removing his wife and children from Athens after the Battle of Chaeronea in 338 BC and was condemned by the judges. The speech of Lycurgus against Autolycus was extant in the time of Harpocration, but has not come down to us.
