= Berenice Syra =

Seleucid queen

Berenice Phernophorus
- Seleucid Queen
- Tenure: 252 - 246 BC
- Born: c. 275 BC; Alexandria
- Died: September/October 246 BC; Antioch
- Spouse: Antiochus II Theos
- Issue: Antiochus
- House: Ptolemaic dynasty
- Father: Ptolemy II Philadelphus
- Mother: Arsinoe I

Berenice (Ancient Greek: Βερενίκη, romanized: Berenikē) (c.275 BC–246 BC), also called Berenice Phernophorus ("Dowry Bearer") or Berenice Syra, was an Egyptian princess and a Seleucid queen regent. She was a Seleucid queen by marriage to Antiochus II Theos, and regent during the minority of her son Antiochus in 246.

== Life ==
Berenice was the daughter of Ptolemy II Philadelphus and Arsinoe I of Egypt. She was named after her paternal grandmother, Berenice I of Egypt. The date of her birth is unknown, but most estimates are before 280, as her mother was exiled the following year.

Berenice Syra's relationship with her father remained positive after her mother's exile. When she moved upon her marriage, he provided her with bottled water from the Nile, so she would never have to drink from any other source.

=== Queen ===
Around 252 BC, following the peace agreement of 253 BC between Antiochus and Ptolemy to end the Second Syrian War, Berenice married the Seleucid monarch Antiochus II Theos, who divorced his wife Laodice I and transferred the succession to Berenice's children. Upon their marriage, she took the name "Syra," referencing Syria. Berenice was fairly old for a Ptolemaic princess to marry. Her dowry was so large, she was known as Phernephorus, or the Dowerbringer.

Antiochus II took up again with his first wife, Laodice. Ptolemy II pressured Antiochus II to return to Berenice, but he repeatedly delayed this. In 246 BC, when Ptolemy died, Ptolemy III increased the diplomatic pressure his father had begun. Antiochus died shortly thereafter, many suspect from poisoning, possibly by Laodice.

=== Regent ===
Queen Berenice claimed the regency for her infant son Antiochus III. Laodice imprisoned Berenice and kidnapped and murdered Antiochus III, placing her own son on the throne. In a public confrontation with Antioch's chief magistrate, possibly about her son having been replaced with a look-alike, Laodice struck and killed Antiochus III. Berenice then pleaded with the assembled crowd for her son's life (not aware of his fate), gaining her sympathy from throughout the Seleucid cities. This sympathy marked her as a stronger foe, and led to her execution by Laodice.

Ptolemy III raised an army and rushed to Antioch in an attempt to save his sister, but arrived too late. Berenice's female attendants conspired, eventually along with her brother, to publish falsified letters proving that Berenice was alive so that Ptolemy III could seize Berenice's dowry.

Ptolemy III set about to avenge his sister's murder by invading Syria and having Laodice killed.

== Legacy ==
Her story may be referenced in the Book of Daniel.
