= Arsinoe I =

Egyptian queen consort

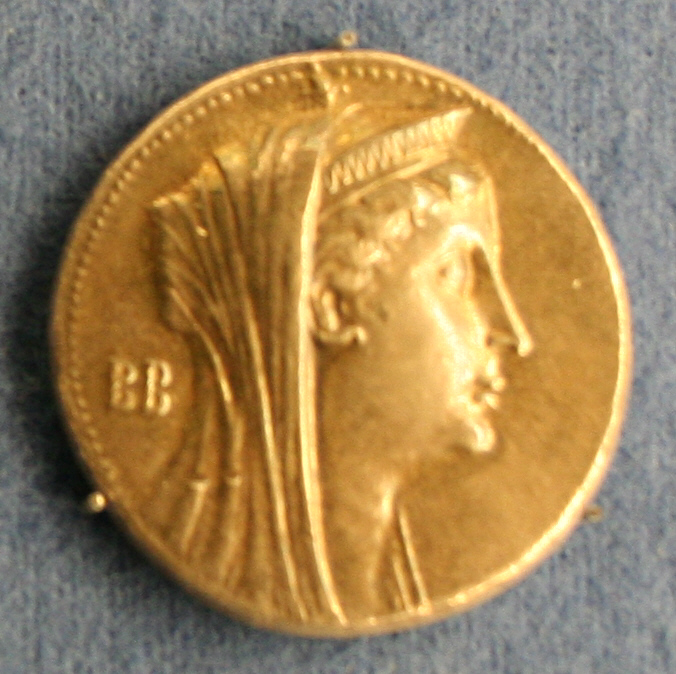
Coin of Arsinoe I, Kestner Museum, Hannover

Arsinoe I (Ancient Greek: Ἀρσινόη, 305 BC – after c. 248 BC) was queen of Egypt by marriage to Ptolemy II Philadelphus.

== Life ==
Arsinoe I was the second daughter and youngest child born to King Lysimachus and Nicaea of Macedon. Her older siblings were Agathocles and Eurydice. Her ancestors were powerful—her paternal grandfather was Agathocles of Pella, a nobleman contemporary to King Philip II of Macedon. Her maternal grandfather was the Regent Antipater. Arsinoe I shared a name with her grandmother, though it is unknown whether it was the mother of Lysimachus or of Nicaea as both women remain unnamed in ancient sources. Little is known of her life prior to her marriage.

=== Queen ===
Between 289/88 and 281 BC, Arsinoe I married her distant maternal cousin, Ptolemy II Philadelphus, pharaoh of the Ptolemaic Kingdom. The marriage was part of Ptolemy's alliance with her father against Seleucus I Nicator. Through her marriage, she became queen of the Ptolemaic kingdom. Together, she and Ptolemy had three children: Ptolemy III Euergetes, Lysimachus of Egypt, and Berenice.

Between after 279-274/3 BC Ptolemy's sister, Arsinoe II Philadelphos, arrived in Egypt. Arsinoe II had married Lysimachus and was therefore both step-mother and sister-in-law to Arsinoe I. Following the death of Lysimachus, Arsinoe II had married her half-brother, Ptolemy Keraunos, but fled to Egypt following a dispute. Soon after Arsinoe II's arrival, charges of conspiracy to assassinate Ptolemy II were brought against Arsinoe I.

As a result of the charges, Ptolemy II convicted Arsinoe I of plotting against him. He repudiated her then exiled her to Coptos in Upper Egypt. It is chronologically plausible that these events were also connected to the banishment of Ptolemy II's niece Theoxena, as Theoxena was sent to the Thebaid, perhaps to Coptos as well.

Afterwards, Ptolemy II married his sister, Arsinoe II, and after her death, his children with Arsinoe I were officially regarded as the children of Arsinoe II.

=== Later life ===
Arsinoe I lived in exile for twenty years. During her exile, she lived in great splendour and enjoyed considerable privilege, since she was the former wife of a pharaoh. Her first son with Ptolemy II succeeded his father after his death.

A surviving stele has been found at Coptos which refers to Arsinoe I. The Stele is of Senu-sher, a steward of Arsinoe I and the Stele is assigned to Arsinoe I's exile. The stele calls Arsinoe I the "king’s wife", but her name is not enclosed in the royal cartouche as was customary for an Egyptian queen. Another piece of surviving evidence connected to Arsinoe I is a Phoenician inscription found at Masub inscription, considered to originate from Umm al-Amad, which counts the year by the reign of "Ptolemy, lord of kings, (the) great, (the) beneficent, son of Ptolemy and Arsinoë, the gods-brothers". Larnakas tis Lapithou pedestal inscription, the Phoenician inscription found at Lapithos, Cyprus, which is dated in the 11th or 12th year in the reign of Ptolemy II, may refer to a sacrifice instituted by Yatonba’al on behalf of "the legitimate scion and his wife", hence refers to Arsinoe I. As Arsinoe I was disgraced as a traitor, the fact the person who did the sacrifice on her behalf strongly suggests that the news of her disgrace had not yet reached him.

== Issue ==
- Ptolemy III Euergetes.
- Lysimachus
- Berenice Phernophorus, married Antiochus II Theos, king of Syria.

== Sources ==
- Bengtson, Hermann (1977). Griechische Geschichte von den Anfängen bis in die römische Kaiserzeit. C.H.Beck.
- "Ptolemaic Genealogy: Arsinoe I". Tyndale House.
- "Arsinoe I". Britannica Online Encyclopedia.
- "Ptolemaic Genealogy: Theoxena". Tyndale House. Archived from the original on 2011-11-26.
- "Lysimachus". Livius.org. Archived from the original on 2014-04-23.
- Heckel, Waldemar (2006). Who's who in the age of Alexander the Great: prosopography of Alexander's empire. Wiley-Blackwell.
- Lightman, M.; Lightman, B. (2007). A to Z of ancient Greek and Roman women. Infobase Publishing (Google eBook).
