= Battle of Corupedium =

Battle in 281 BC

- Part of the Wars of the Diadochi
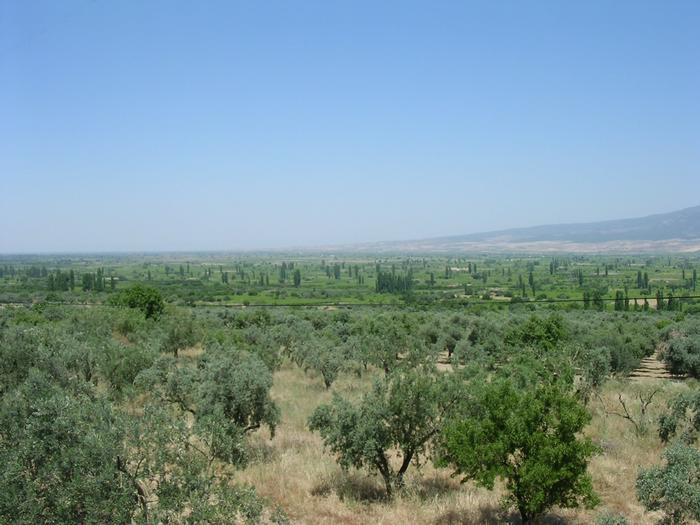
- The plain of Corupedium
Date	281 BC
Location	Near Sardis (modern-day Sart, Manisa, Turkey) 38.546466°N 27.617792°E
Result	Seleucid victory
Territorial changes	Seleucids gain control of Anatolia

Belligerents
Seleucid Empire	Lysimachid Kingdom

Commanders and leaders
Seleukos I	Lysimachos †
- Location of the Battle of Corupedium. Battle of Corupedium (Turkey)

The Battle of Corupedium, also called Koroupedion, Corupedion or Curupedion (Ancient Greek: Κύρου πεδίον or Κόρου πεδίον, "the plain of Kyros or Koros") was the last battle between the Diadochi, the rival successors to Alexander the Great. It was fought in 281 BC between the armies of Lysimachus and Seleucus I Nicator. Lysimachus had ruled Thrace for decades and parts of western Asia Minor ever since the Battle of Ipsus. Recently he had finally gained control over Macedon. Seleucus ruled the Seleucid Empire, including lands currently covered by modern eastern Turkey, Syria, Lebanon, Israel, Iraq, and Iran. Almost nothing is known about the battle itself save that Seleucus won the battle. Lysimachus died during the fighting. According to Memnon of Heraclea's History of Heraclea Pontica, Lysimachus was killed by a javelin thrown by Malacon, a Heracleian soldier serving under Seleucus.

Although the victory gave Seleucus nominal control over nearly every part of Alexander's empire, save the Ptolemaic Kingdom of Egypt, his victory was short-lived. After crossing the Hellespont to take possession of Lysimachus' European holdings not long after the battle, Seleucus was assassinated by Ptolemy Keraunos and Macedon swiftly became independent once again.

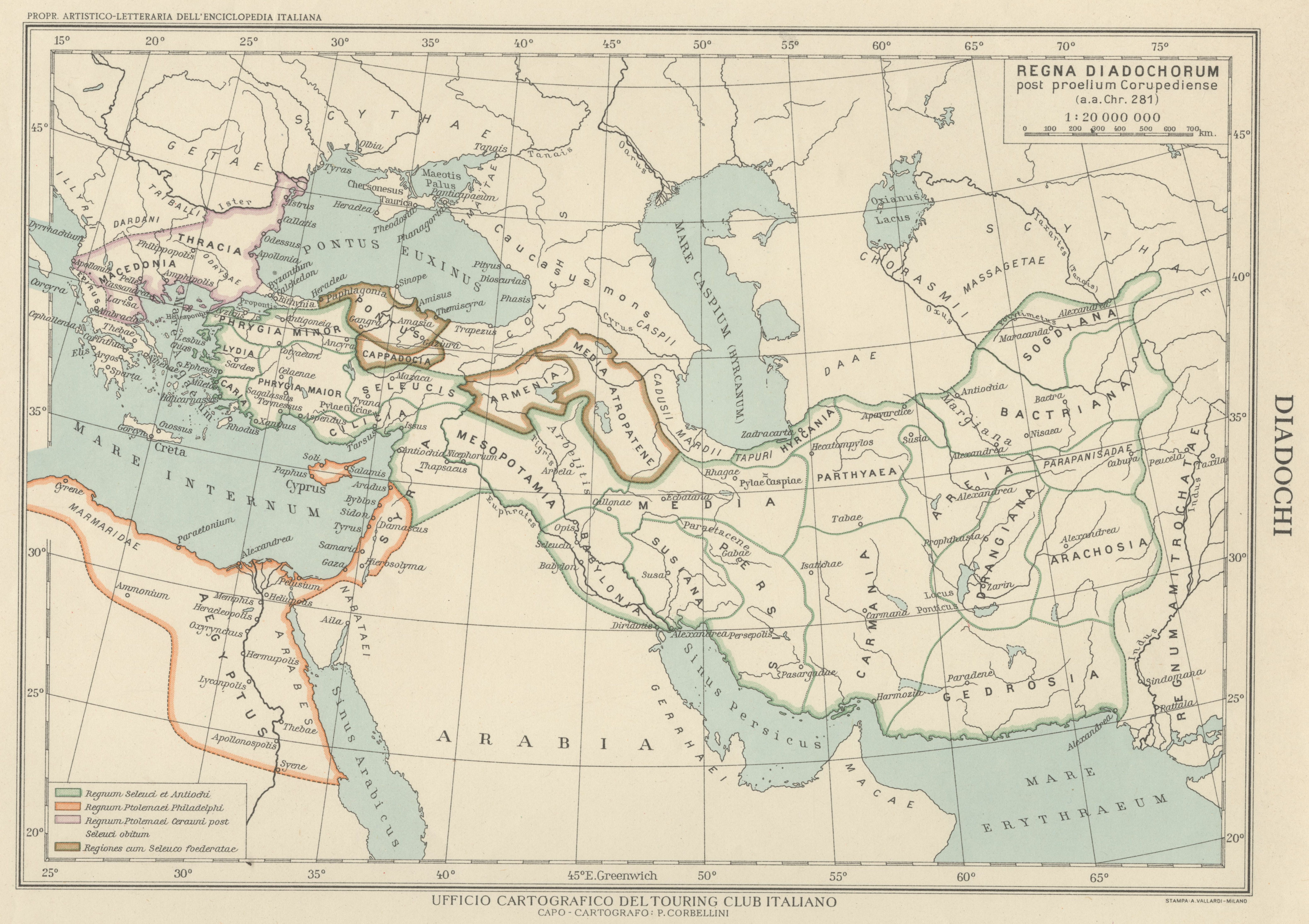
Map The Kingdom of the Diadochis after the battle of Corupedio

The two men had been rivals for a long time as Lysimachus wished to expand his influence east, while Seleucus wished to expand his influence west, however, the event that actually started the war was the murder of Agathocles. Agathocles was the eldest son of Lysimachus and his first wife Nicaea and was the heir to his father’s realm. However, Lysimachus’ third and current wife, Arsinoe, wanted her children on the throne and so conspired with Ptolemy Keraunos to have Agathocles killed. They accused him of plotting with Seleucus to take the throne, and Lysimachus was convinced and put his son to death. This terrible act led many cities in Asia Minor to revolt against the rule of Thrace. Agathocles’ widow and their children fled to Seleucus, giving him an opportunity to attack Lysimachus when he was weak, which he could not refuse. He invaded and subsequently won at Corupedion.
