= Nicaea of Macedon =

Macedonian noblewoman

Nicaea (Greek: Nίκαια, c. 335 – c. 302 BC) was a Greek Macedonian noblewoman and was a daughter of the powerful regent Antipater. Her mother's name is unknown. She was born and raised in Macedonia while her father was governor of Macedonia during the reign of Greek King Alexander the Great.

Nicaea was sent by her father to Asia accompanied by her brother Iollas and a certain Archias in 323 BC to be married to the Macedonian military commander, Perdiccas, at a time when Perdiccas still hoped to maintain friendly relations with the regent. Perdiccas, despite already entertaining hostile designs, married Nicaea. Not so long afterwards, on the advice of Eumenes, Perdiccas decided to divorce Nicaea, so he could marry Cleopatra of Macedon, the full sister of Alexander the Great. Perdiccas took this step before setting out on his expedition to Egypt. His decision to divorce Nicaea led to an immediate rupture in the relations between Perdiccas and Antipater.

Around 321 BC, as part of an alliance agreement, Antipater married Nicaea to Lysimachus, who governed Thrace. In 306 BC Lysimachus became King of Thrace, Asia Minor and Macedon. Nicaea bore Lysimachus three children: one son Agathocles; and two daughters: Eurydice and Arsinoe I.

Nicaea died from unknown causes sometime between 302 BC and 300 BC. Shortly after her death, Lysimachus renamed a city in Bithynia, Asia Minor, calling the city Nicaea (modern İznik, Turkey) in honour of his late wife.

== Sources ==
- Strabo, Geography, xii, 4;
- Stephanus of Byzantium, Ethnica, s.v. "Nikaia"
