= Alexander (son of Lysimachus) =

3rd-century BC Macedonian noble

Alexander (Greek: Ἀλέξανδρος, flourished 3rd century BC) was a son of the diadochus Lysimachus, a Greek nobleman of Macedonian Thessalian origin, by an Odrysian concubine called Macris.

Following the murder of his paternal half-brother Agathocles by the command of his father in 284 BC, he fled into Asia with his brother's widow Lysandra and solicited the aid of Seleucus I Nicator. As a consequence, war ensued between Seleucus and Lysimachus, ending in the defeat and death of the latter, who was slain in battle in 281 BC, in the plain of Corius in Phrygia. Alexander conveyed his father's body to Lysimachia, to be buried in a tomb between Cardia and Pactya, where it still stood in the time of Pausanias, four centuries later.

He may have spent the rest of his life as a hostage in Egypt. According to Diodorus Siculus, he ruled Macedonia for a short time.
