= Lysandra =

- Queen of Macedonia
- Spouse: Alexander V of Macedon; Agathocles
- Issue: at least 2 children by Agathocles
- Dynasty: Ptolemaic, Macedonian & Thracian
- Father: Ptolemy I Soter
- Mother: Berenice

Lysandra (Greek: Λυσάνδρα, meaning "Liberator, Emancipator"; lived 281 BC) was a Queen of Macedonia, daughter of Ptolemy I Soter to Eurydice or Berenice.

She was married first to her maternal cousin Alexander, one of the sons of Cassander, King of Macedonia. After Alexander’s death, Lysandra married her other maternal cousin Agathocles, the son of Lysimachus and Nicaea of Macedon. By this second marriage (which took place, according to Pausanias, after the return of Lysimachus from his expedition against the Getae, 291 BC) she had several children, with whom and with Agathocles' paternal half-brother Alexander she fled to Asia after the murder of her husband by Lysimachus, at the instigation of Agathocles’ stepmother Arsinoe II, and besought assistance from Seleucus I Nicator. The latter in consequence marched against Lysimachus, who was defeated and slain in the Battle of Corupedium, 281 BC. From an expression of Pausanias, it appears that Lysandra must at this time have accompanied Seleucus I, and was possessed of much influence, but in the confusion that followed the death of Seleucus I a few months after there is no further record either of her or her children.

== Sources ==
- Smith, William (editor); Dictionary of Greek and Roman Biography and Mythology, "Lysandra", Boston, (1867)
