= Agathocles (son of Lysimachus) =

3rd-century BC Thracian general

Agathocles (Ancient Greek: Ἀγαθοκλῆς; between 320–310s – 284 BC) was a prince of Macedonian and Thessalian descent. He was the son of Lysimachus and his first wife, Nicaea a daughter of Antipater, the regent of Alexander the Great's Empire. His full blooded siblings were his younger sisters Eurydice and Arsinoe I.

== Life ==
In 292 BC Agathocles was sent by his father against the Getae, but was defeated and taken prisoner. Dromichaetes, the king of the Getae, sent him back to his father as a goodwill gesture; despite this, Lysimachus marched against the Getae, but was himself taken prisoner. He was released by Dromichaetes after a promise of loyalty secured by several high-born hostages, and the hand of Lysimachus' daughter in marriage. There are conflicting versions of this sequence of events as some ancient historians recount that it was only Agathocles, and according to others only Lysimachus, who was taken prisoner.

In 287 Agathocles was sent by his father against Demetrius I Poliorcetes, who had marched into Anatolia to deprive Lysimachus of Lydia and Caria. In this expedition he was successful; he defeated Demetrius and drove him out of his father's provinces. Agathocles was originally intended to be the successor of Lysimachus, and was popular among his subjects; however, in 284 he was executed for treason. Conflicting sources point to his stepmother, Arsinoe II, as the main accuser in an attempt to position her own son, Ptolemy, as Lysimachus' successor, while other sources indicate that Lysimachus was independently acting on a belief that his son was conspiring against him. Agathocles' widow, Lysandra, fled with their children and Agathocles' paternal half-brother, Alexander, to Seleucus I Nicator in Syria, who subsequently declared war upon Lysimachus as consequence for his act of filicide.

== Coinage ==
The historian Louis Robert has suggested that 300 era coins bearing the letters ΑΓΑΘ originate from Agathocleia, a city in Mysia founded by Agathocles.

== Sources ==
- Smith, William (editor); Dictionary of Greek and Roman Biography and Mythology, "Agathocles (2)"^{[usurped]}, Boston, (1867)
- Ptolemaic Genealogy: Arsinoe I
- H. Bengtson, Griechische Geschichte von den Anfängen bis in die römische Kaiserzeit, C.H.Beck, 1977
- M. Getzel, Hellenistic settlements in Europe, the islands and Asia Minor, Cohen University of California Press, 1995
- W. Heckel, Who's who in the age of Alexander the Great: prosopography of Alexander’s empire, Wiley-Blackwell, 2006
