= Lysimachia (Thrace) =

Ancient city in Turkey

- Λυσιμάχεια (Ancient Greek)
- Location within Marmara
- 40°35′N 26°53′E
- Type: Settlement
- Location: Kavakköy, Gelibolu, Çanakkale, Gulf of Saros, Turkey
- Region: Thrace

History
- Built: 309 BC
- Built by: Lysimachus

Lysimachia (Greek: Λυσιμάχεια) was an important Hellenistic Greek town on the north-western extremity of the Thracian Chersonese (the modern Gallipoli peninsula) in the neck where the peninsula joins the mainland in what is now the European part of Turkey, not far from the bay of Melas (the modern Gulf of Saros). It is located near the modern village of Bolayır, not at Hexamili, as previously thought.

== History ==
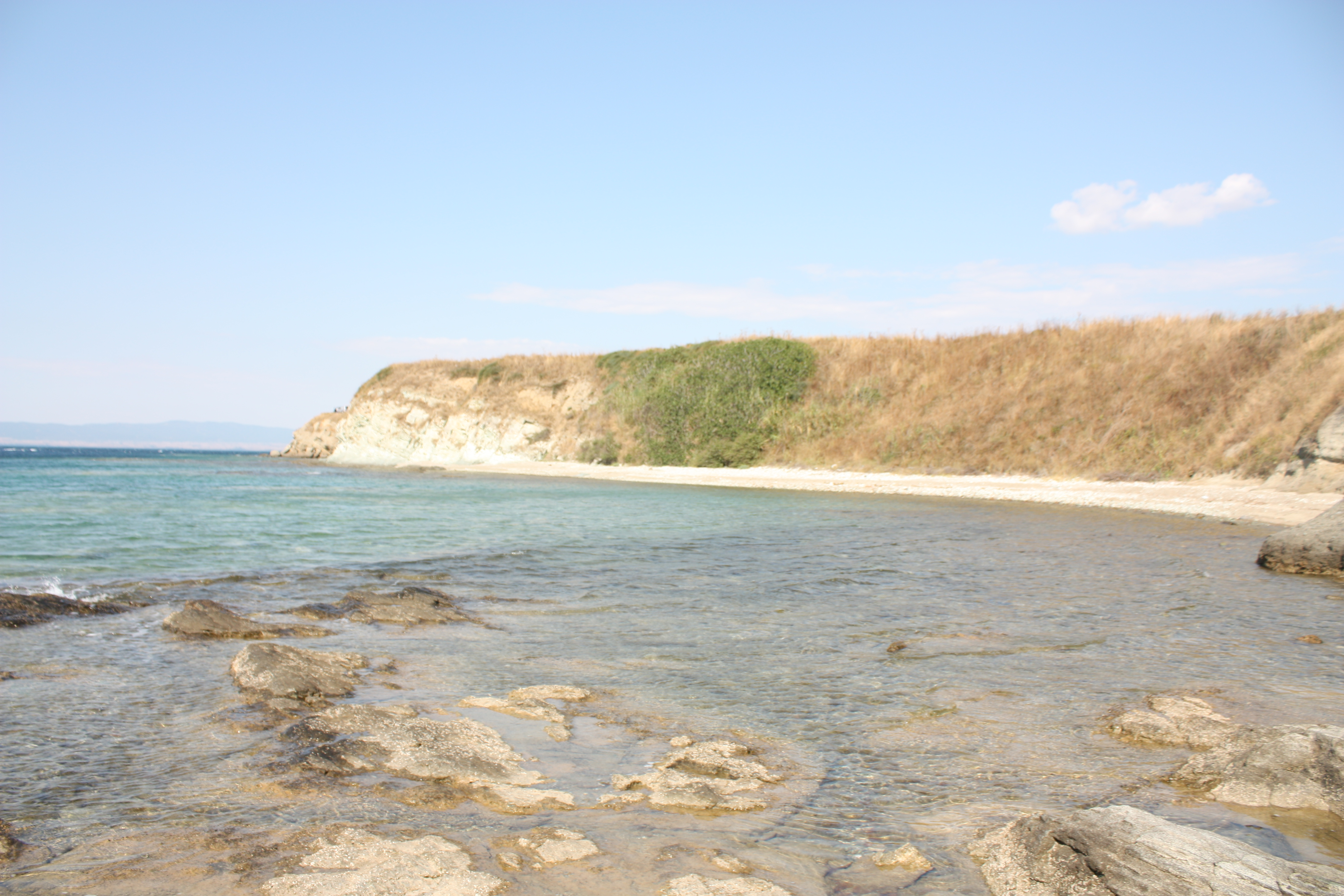
The coast of Bolayır, Turkey, thought to be the modern-day location of Lysimachia

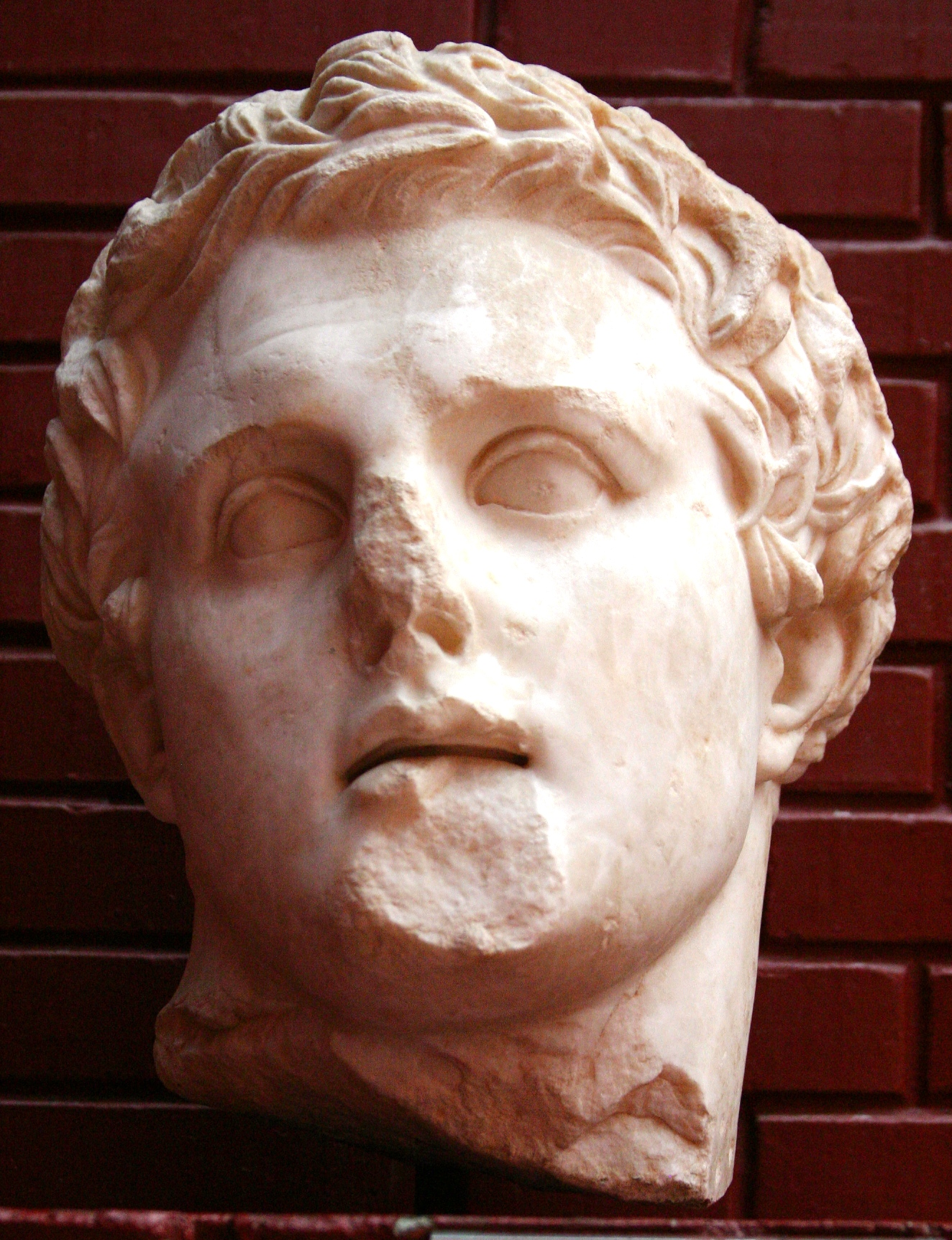
Bust of Lysimachus, founder of Lysimachia

The city was built by Lysimachus in 309 BC, when he was preparing for war with his rivals; for the new city, being situated on the isthmus, commanded the road from Sestos to the north and the mainland of Thrace. In order to obtain inhabitants for his new city, Lysimachus destroyed the neighbouring town of Cardia, the birthplace of the historian Hieronymus, and settled the inhabitants of it and other Chersonesean cities here. Lysimachus no doubt made Lysimachia the capital of his kingdom, and it must have rapidly risen to great splendour and prosperity.

After his death the city fell under Seleucid dominion, and during the wars between Seleucus Callinicus and Ptolemy Euergetes it passed from the hands of the Seleucids into those of the Ptolemies. Whether these latter set the town free, or whether it emancipated itself, is uncertain; at any rate it entered into the relation of sympolity with the Aetolian League. In 287 BC, the city was severely damaged by an earthquake, as reported by the Roman historian Justin (17.1.1–3). In 277 BC, near Lysimachia the Macedonian king Antigonus II Gonatas defeated the Gauls. As the Aetolians were not able to afford the town the necessary protection, it was destroyed again in 197 BC by the Thracians during the war of the Romans against Philip V of Macedon. The Seleucid king Antiochus the Great restored the place, collected the scattered and enslaved inhabitants, and attracted colonists from all parts by generous promises. This restoration, however, appears to have been unsuccessful, and under the dominion of Rome it decayed more and more.

The last time the place is mentioned under its ancient name, is in a passage of Ammianus Marcellinus. The emperor Justinian (527–565) restored it and surrounded it with strong fortifications, and after that time it is spoken of only under the name of Hexamilion. The place now occupying the site of Lysimachia, Eksemil, derives its name from the Justinianian fortress, though the ruins of the ancient city are more numerous in the neighbouring village of Ortaköy.
