= Agathocles of Pella =

Greek nobleman

Agathocles (Greek: Ἀγαθοκλῆς, flourished 4th century BC) was a Greek nobleman who was a contemporary to King Philip II of Macedon (reigned 359 BC–336 BC).

Agathocles was a Thessalian serf from Crannon. His father’s name may have been Alcimachus. It was through his flattery that Agathocles became an intimate friend of Philip II, who raised him to high rank. Agathocles and his family were granted Macedonian citizenship. Agathocles shared in Philip II’s councils and Phillip II sent him to deal with the Perrhaebi and Agathocles took charge of affairs in that area.

There is a possibility that Phillip II rewarded Agathocles for his services with estates in Pella. Agathocles became a favorite in the Argead court in Pella and his family assimilated into Macedonian society.

Agathocles married an unnamed Greek woman, a local Thessalian, perhaps called Arsinoe. They had four sons:

- Alcimachus
- Lysimachus, one of the Diadochi of Alexander the Great
- Autodicus
- Philip

== Sources ==
- Ancient Library Article: Agathocles no.1
- Lysimachus’ article at Livius.org
- H.S. Lund, Lysimachus: A Study in Early Hellenistic Kingship, Routledge, 2002
- W. Heckel, Who’s who in the age of Alexander the Great: prosopography of Alexander’s empire, Wiley-Blackwell, 2006
