= Antigonus =

Antigonus or Antigonos (Ancient Greek: Ἀντίγονος), a Greek name meaning "comparable to his father" or "worthy of his father", may refer to:

== Rulers ==
- Three Macedonian kings of the Antigonid dynasty that succeeded Alexander the Great:
  - Antigonus I Monophthalmus (382–301 BC)
  - Antigonus II Gonatas (319–239 BC)
  - Antigonus III Doson (263–221 BC)
    - Antigonus, son of Echecrates, the nephew of Antigonus III Doson
- Antigonus II Mattathias (died 37 BC), last ruler of the Hasmonean kingdom of Judea

== Military leaders ==
- Antigonus (Seleucid admiral), son of Menophilus, Seleucid admiral of the mid-2nd century BC
- Antigonus, a general of King Perseus in the Third Macedonian War, was sent to Aenia to guard the coast

== Authors ==
- Antigonus (historian), Greek writer on history
- Antigonus of Alexandria, ancient Greek grammarian
- Antigonus of Carystus, 3rd century BC Greek writer on various subjects
- Antigonus of Cumae, ancient Greek writer on agriculture
- Antigonus of Sokho, Jewish scholar of the 3rd century BC
- Antigonus, writer on painting, mentioned by Diogenes Laërtius

== Others ==
- Antigonus (physician), an ancient Greek surgeon
- Antigonus (sculptor), a Greek sculptor of the 3rd century BC
- Antigonos (son of Callas), Macedonian hetairos and athlete of the late 4th century BC
- Antigonus (butterfly), a genus of skipper butterflies
- Antigonus (character) from The Winter's Tale by William Shakespeare
