= Berenice (daughter of Ptolemy II of Telmessos) =

Berenice also known as Berenike (Greek: Βερενίκη; fl. second half of 3rd century BC and first half of 2nd century BC), was a Greek Princess from Asia Minor who was a distant relative of the Seleucid Monarch Antiochus III the Great.

== Family background ==
Berenice was of Thessalian and Macedonian ancestry. She was the daughter and known child born to Ptolemy II of Telmessos by a mother whose name is unknown. Her paternal grandfather was Lysimachus of Telmessos; her paternal great-uncle was Epigonos of Telmessos; her father's paternal first cousin was Antipater Epigonos and likely had a paternal second cousin called Epigonos.

Through her paternal great-grandfather Ptolemy I Epigone, she was a direct descendant of Lysimachus who was one of the Diadochi of the Greek King Alexander the Great who was King of Thrace, Asia Minor and Macedonia and the Ptolemaic Greek Princess who was Queen of the Ptolemaic Kingdom of Ancient Egypt Arsinoe II. Through Arsinoe II, Berenice was a direct descendant of Cassander, the brother of the powerful Regent Antipater. Berenice is the only known biological female descendant from the marriage of Arsinoe II and Lysimachus.

== Life ==
Berenice was born in Telmessos in Lycia possibly between 214 BC-209 BC, during the reign of her paternal grandfather Lysimachus of Telmessos, who ruled from February 240 BC until his death in 206 BC. She was raised in the city. She was born at the time, when her distant paternal relative Arsinoe III of Egypt was an Egyptian Queen of the Ptolemaic Kingdom from 220 BC until July or August 204 BC. When her paternal grandfather died, her father Ptolemy II ruled as the third and final Ptolemaic Client King of Telmessos, as he ruled from 206 BC until at least 181 BC. Her father was also the fourth and final ruler from the Lysimachid dynasty, which is also known as the Ptolemaic/Lysimachid dynasty in Lycia to rule the city. Berenice was named in honor of Berenice II, the first maternal cousin of her paternal great-grandfather who was also a paternal second cousin to her paternal grandfather. Berenice II was an Egyptian Queen of the Ptolemaic Kingdom, was the wife of her paternal first cousin Pharaoh Ptolemy III Euergetes and mother of Arsinoe III and Ptolemy IV Philopator. She was also named after another Berenice, another daughter of Berenice II and Ptolemy III who was the sister to Arsinoe III.

It seems likely that her family had relative autonomy from Ptolemaic control increased. As Ptolemaic power declined rapidly and dramatically outside of Egypt after the death of Ptolemy III Euergetes in 222 BC, probably Berenice's family with her relatives had the motive and opportunity for divorcing themselves from Ptolemaic suzerainty. At an unknown date during her paternal grandfather's reign, Berenice's family and relatives were enjoying excellent cordial relations with the Seleucid monarch Antiochus III the Great. Antiochus III reigned from 222 BC until 187 BC, was an enemy of the Ptolemies who was at the time expanding Seleucid power in Asia Minor.

In 197 BC, the region of Lycia was no longer under Ptolemaic control as it was under the occupation of Antiochus III. Her father, Ptolemy II became a Client King of Telmessos under Seleucid rule. By this time Ptolemy II with his family having excellent relations with Antiochus III reveals they had broken away from Ptolemaic influence, however there is a possibility their family connections with the Ptolemaic dynasty wasn't wholly broken.

The friendly relations between Ptolemy II and his family with Antiochus III is attested when in 193 BC Berenice, was appointed by Antiochus III as chief-priestess of the Carian Satrapy, of the Seleucid Royal Cult of Laodice. Laodice was a Seleucid Queen and the cousin-wife of Antiochus III. According to an intact stone inscription found in Nahavand Iran dated in 193 BC, Berenice's father is described as a relative of Antiochus III. This reflects his court title and in fact, Ptolemy II and Antiochus III are distantly related.

Below are two surviving letters translated from Greek regarding Berenice's chief-priestess appointment. The letters reveal her family's relations and status with Antiochus III. The first letter is from Antiochus III addressed to the Strategos of the Carian Satrapy and is the above-mentioned stone inscription from Nahavand, Iran:

King Antiochus to Anaximbrotos, greeting. As we desire to increase still further the honors of our sister Queen Laodice, and we think this most important for ourselves because she not only lives with us lovingly and considerately but is also reverently disposed towards the divine, we continue to do lovingly the things which it is fitting and right for her to receive from us and we have decided that just as there are appointed throughout the kingdom chief priests of us, (so) there are to be established [in] the same districts chief priestesses of her also, who shall wear golden crowns bearing her [images] and who shall be mentioned in [the] contracts alter the chief priests of our [ancestors] and of us. Since, therefore, the in districts under your administration Berenice, the daughter of our relative Ptolemy (son) of Lysimachus, has been appointed, carry everything out according to what has been written above and have copies of the letters, inscribed on stelae, set up in the most conspicuous places, so that both now and in the future there may be evident to all in these matters also our policy towards our sister.

The second letter is addressed to the Hyparch of the district from the Strategos of the Carian satrapy:

[Anaxim]brotos to Dionytas, greeting. Enclosed is the copy of the decree written by the king concerning the appointment of Berenice, the daughter of Ptolemy son of Lysimachus, as chief priestess of the queen of the satrapy. Carry out (the matter) according to the instructions, just as he enjoins, and see to it that copies, inscribed on a stone stele, are set up in the most conspicuous place. Farewell. Year 119, Artemisios 19. [May 9 193 BC]

After her chief-priestess appointment, not much more is known on Berenice.

== Sources ==
- Lysimachus’ article at Livius.org
- Berenice II’s article at Livius.org
- Arsinoe III’s article at Livius.org
- Ptolemaic Genealogy: Berenice I
- Ptolemaic Genealogy: Ptolemy "the Son"
- R.A. Billows, Kings and colonists: aspects of Macedonian imperialism, BRILL, 1995
- M.G. Cohen, The Hellenistic settlements in Europe, the Islands, and Asia Minor, University of California Press, 1995
- J.D. Grainger, A Seleukid prosopography and gazetteer, BRILL, 1997
- R.S. Bagnall & P. Derow, The Hellenistic Period: historical sources in translation, Wiley-Blackwell, 2004
