= Berenice =

Berenice (Ancient Greek: Βερενίκη, Bereníkē) is the Ancient Macedonian form of the Attic Greek name Φερενίκη Pherenikē, which means "bearer of victory" from Ancient Greek φέρω (pherō) 'to bear' and νίκη (nikē) 'victory'. Berenika, priestess of Demeter in Lete ca. 350 BC, is the oldest epigraphical evidence. The Latin variant Veronica is a direct transliteration. The name also has the form Bernice.

== Places ==
- Berenice, Cyrenaica, an ancient Greek city in Libya.
- Berenice Troglodytica, an ancient Greek city in Egypt

== People ==
=== Ancient world ===
==== Ptolemaic and Seleucid queens and royal daughters in Cyrenaica and Egypt ====
- Berenice I (c. 340 BC – between 279 and 268 BC), mother of Magas of Cyrene and wife of Ptolemy I of Egypt
- Berenice Syra (c. 275 BC – 246 BC), daughter of Ptolemy II of Egypt and wife of Seleucid monarch Antiochus II Theos
- Berenice II (267 or 266 BC – 221 BC), daughter of Magas of Cyrene, wife of Ptolemy III of Egypt and traditional namesake of the constellation Coma Berenices
- Berenice III (120–80 BC), daughter of Ptolemy IX of Egypt; she first married Ptolemy X of Egypt, and later Ptolemy XI of Egypt
- Berenice IV (77–55 BC), daughter of Ptolemy XII of Egypt and elder sister of Cleopatra VII
- Berenice (3rd to 2nd century BC), Greek princess and chief priestess of the Carian Satrapy, great-granddaughter of Ptolemy Epigonos and daughter of the third and final Ptolemaic Client King of Telmessos.

==== Judean princesses ====
- Berenice (daughter of Salome) (1st century BC), daughter of Salome I, a sister of Herod the Great and mother of Herod Agrippa
- Berenice (28–?), a daughter of Herod Agrippa I, wife of Herod of Chalcis until 48, then spent much of her life at the court of her brother, Herod Agrippa II. She is chiefly known for her love affair with the Roman general (later emperor)Titus
- Berenice (after 50–?), a granddaughter of Herod Agrippa I

==== Saints ====
- Berenice, also known as Saint Veronica, 1st-century saint from Jerusalem
- Domnina, Berenice, and Prosdoce, 4th-century Christian martyrs

==== Others ====
- Berenice (Oxyrhynchus), Roman Egyptian wine merchant
- Berenice of Chios (died 72/71 BC), third wife of Mithridates VI of Pontus
- The daughter in the exorcism of the Syrophoenician woman's daughter, one of the miracles of Jesus recounted in the Christian Gospels
- Berenice, wife of Seuthes III and Thracian queen

=== Modern era ===
- Berenice Abbott (1898–1991), American photographer
- Bérénice Bejo (born 1976), French-Argentine actress
- Berenice Celeyta, Colombian human rights activist
- Berenice Mallory (1901–1997), American home economist
- Bérénice Marlohe (born 1979), French actress
- Berenice Seara, Brazilian journalist
- Bernice Slote (1913–1983), poet and Willa Cather scholar
- Berenice Sydney (1944–1983), English artist
- Berenice Wicki (born 2002), Swiss snowboarder
- Bernice Williams, American blues singer

== See also ==
- Maé-Bérénice Méité, French figure skater
