= Magas of Egypt =

Son of Ptolemy III and Berenice

Magas (Greek Mάγας; 241 BC - 221 BC) was a grandson of Magas of Cyrene, being a son of Ptolemy III Euergetes (246–221 BC) and Berenice. He was put to death by his brother Ptolemy IV Philopator (221–204 BC), soon after the accession of the latter, at the instigation of Sosibius.

== Ancestry ==
Ancestors of Magas of Egypt

16. Lagus
8. Ptolemy I Soter, Pharaoh of Egypt
17. Arsinoe of Macedon
4. Ptolemy II Philadelphus, Pharaoh of Egypt
18. Magas of Macedon (=26)
9. Berenice I of Egypt (=13)
19. Antigone of Macedon (daughter of Cassander) (=27)
2. Ptolemy III Euergetes, Pharaoh of Egypt
20. Agathocles of Pella
10. Lysimachus, King of Thrace, Asia Minor and Macedon
21. Arsinoe
5. Arsinoe I
22. Antipater, Regent of Macedonia
11. Nicaea of Macedon
1. Magas of Egypt
24. Amyntas
12. Philip
6. Magas, King of Cyrenaica
26. Magas of Macedon (=18)
13. Berenice I of Egypt (=9)
27. Antigone of Macedon (daughter of Cassander) (=19)
3. Berenice II of Egypt
28. Seleucus I Nicator, Basileus of the Seleucid Empire
14. Antiochus I Soter, Basileus of the Seleucid Empire
29. Apama (daughter of Spitamenes)
7. Apama II
30. Demetrius I, King of Macedon
15. Stratonice of Syria
31. Phila of Macedon (daughter of 22)
