= Antipater son of Epigonus =

Antipater son of Epigonos (Ancient Greek: Ἀντίπατρος Ἐπιγόνου, romanized: Antipatros Epigonou, flourished second half of 3rd century BC and first half of 2nd century BC) was a Greek prince from Asia Minor.

== Family background ==
Antipater was a prince of Thessalian and Macedonian ancestry. He was the son born to Epigonus of Telmessos by an unnamed wife. He may have been a nephew of Lysimachus of Telmessos; and cousin of Ptolemy II and Berenice of Telmessos, and thus a descendant of Lysimachus and Ptolemy I Soter, companions of Alexander the Great who subsequently became kings of portions of his empire, but the connection of Epigonus and Antipater to this Telmessian dynasty is disputed

== Life ==
Little is known on the life of Antipater, as he was a part of the Lysimachid dynasty, which is also known as the Ptolemaic/Lysimachid dynasty in Lycia in ruling the city of Telmessos. Antipater was born and raised in Telmessos in Lycia at an unknown date during the reign of Lysimachus of Telmessos. Lysimachus of Telmessos, ruled as the second Ptolemaic Client King of Telmessos from February 240 BC until his death in 206 BC. Lysimachus’ son, Ptolemy II of Telmessos, ruled from 206 BC until at least 181 BC. Ptolemy II was the fourth and final ruler from their family to rule Telmessos and was also, the third and final Ptolemaic Client King of Telmessos.

His first name Antipater, recalls the great marshal Antipater of Philip II of Macedon and Alexander the Great. Antipater was a distant relation of the great marshal Antipater, through Berenice I. Berenice I was the great-niece of the great marshal Antipater, through her maternal grandfather Cassander, the brother of Antipater. His second name Epigonos, which is his Epithet means in Greek heir. His Epithet is attest from his paternal grandfather Ptolemy I Epigone.

It seems likely that his family had relative autonomy from Ptolemaic control increased and it is unclear his family's relationship were with the Pharaohs in Alexandria. As Ptolemaic power declined rapidly and dramatically outside of Egypt after the death of Ptolemy III Euergetes in 222 BC, probably Antipater's father and their extended family had the motive and opportunity for divorcing themselves from Ptolemaic suzerainty. At an unknown date during the reign of Lysimachus of Telmessos, Antipater and his relatives were enjoying excellent cordial relations with the Seleucid monarch Antiochus III the Great. Antiochus III reigned from 222 BC until 187 BC, was an enemy of the Ptolemies who was at the time expanding Seleucid power in Asia Minor.

In 197 BC, the region of Lycia was no longer under Ptolemaic control as it was under the occupation of Antiochus III, thus Ptolemy II became a Client King of Telmessos under Seleucid rule. By this time Ptolemy II, Antipater with their families having excellent relations with Antiochus III reveals they had broken away from Ptolemaic influence, however there is a possibility their family connections with the Ptolemaic dynasty wasn't not wholly broken.

During the Treaty of Apamea in 188 BC, Antiochus III was forced to give the region of Lycia to the King Eumenes II of Pergamon. In the Treaty of Apamea, Ptolemy II's position was explicitly safeguarded. According to dedication inscriptions on the Greek island of Delos, Ptolemy II made offerings of thanks for the Peace of Apamea. This included an offering from Ptolemy II in association with Antipater. From 188 BC until at least 181 BC, Ptolemy II became a Client King under the rule of Eumenes II. Probably Ptolemy II sided with Rome as Eumenes II was an ally to Rome. Though Ptolemy II was able to retain his rule of Telmessos and his major land-holdings under Eumenes II, the family of Ptolemy II and Antipater is not heard of thereafter. Antipater was the likely father of Epigonos by an unnamed wife.

== Sources ==
- Lysimachus’ article at Livius.org
- Ptolemaic Genealogy: Berenice I
- Ptolemaic Genealogy: Ptolemy "the Son"
- R.S. Bagnall, The administration of the Ptolemaic possessions outside Egypt, Brill Archive, 1976
- R.A. Billows, Kings and colonists: aspects of Macedonian imperialism, BRILL, 1995
- M.G. Cohen, The Hellenistic settlements in Europe, the Islands, and Asia Minor, University of California Press, 1995
- J.D. Grainger, A Seleukid prosopography and gazetteer, BRILL, 1997
