= Antigone (disambiguation) =

Antigone is the daughter of Oedipus and his mother Jocasta in Greek mythology.

Antigone or Antigoni may also refer to:

== People ==
- Antigone (mythology), several characters in Greek mythology
- Antigoni Buxton (born 1996), English singer
- Antigone of Epirus (fl. 317–295 BC), daughter of Berenice I of Egypt and wife of Pyrrhus of Epirus
- Antigone Foster, Australian singer and songwriter based in the UK, known professionally as Antigone
- Antigone of Gloucester, Countess of Tankerville (fl. 1428–1450), daughter of Humphrey Plantagenet, Duke of Gloucester
- Antigone Kefala (1935–2022), Australian poet and prose-writer of Greek-Romanian heritage
- Antigone of Macedon, daughter of Cassander, mother of Berenice I of Egypt
- Antigone Marino, Italian physicist
- Antigoni Papadopoulou (born 1954), Cypriot politician
- Antigoni Papadopoulou (born 2003), Greek footballer
- Antigoni Psychrami (born 1987), Greek singer
- Antigoni Roumpesi (born 1983), Greek water polo player
- Antigone, pseudonym of Antonio Papasso (1932–2014), Italian painter and engraver

== Arts and entertainment ==
- Antigone (Sophocles play), by Sophocles
  - Antigone (Mendelssohn) (1841), a suite of incidental music by Felix Mendelssohn to Sophocles' play
  - Antigone (1961 film), a Greek film based on Sophocles' play
  - Antigone (Wednesday Theatre), a 1966 Australian television play adaptation
  - Antigone (1970 film), a Norwegian film of the 1970s
  - Antigone (2019 film), a Canadian film directed by Sophie Deraspe
- Antigone (Euripides play), by Euripides
- Antigone (Rotrou play), a 1638 play by Jean Rotrou
- Antigone (Anouilh play), Jean Anouilh's play
- Antigone (Cocteau play), Jean Cocteau's play, based on Sophocles
- Antigone (Garnier play), a 1580 play by Robert Garnier
- Antigone (Brecht play), a 1948 play by Bertolt Brecht
- Antigonae, a 1949 opera adaptation of the myth by Carl Orff
- Antigonai, an opera by Carlos Stella
- Antigone (Honegger), a 1927 opera by Arthur Honegger
- "Antigone", a 1999 song by Nebula from the album To the Center
- Antigone (Heaven Shall Burn album), 2004
- Antigone (Eiko Ishibashi album), 2025

== Other uses ==
- Antigone Association, Italian prisoners' human rights monitoring organization
- ANTIGONE, mathematical software
- Antigone (bird), a genus of cranes
- Antigone (island), one of the Princes' Islands
- Antigone, Montpellier, a redeveloped urban area in Montpellier, France
- 129 Antigone, an asteroid
- French submarine Antigone, 1916–1935
- HMS Antigone, a fictional Royal Navy light cruiser in Warren Tute's novel The Cruiser

== See also ==
- Antigens, molecules
- Antigona (disambiguation)
- Antigone in the Amazon, by Milo Rau
- Antigonea (disambiguation)
- Antigonia (disambiguation)
- Antigonus (disambiguation)
