= Ptolemy II of Telmessos =

3rd-century BC Greek people

Ptolemy II of Telmessos (Ancient Greek: Πτολεμαίος Τελμησσεύς, romanized: Ptolemaios Telmēsseus, flourished second half of 3rd century BC & first half of 2nd century BC) who is also known as Ptolemy II, Ptolemy of Telmessos and Ptolemy, son of Lysimachus was a Greek Prince from Asia Minor who served as a Ptolemaic Client King under the Ptolemaic dynasty of Ancient Egypt.

== Family background ==
Ptolemy II was a prince of Thessalian and Macedonian ancestry. He was the son and successor born to Lysimachus of Telmessos by an unnamed woman. He had a paternal uncle called Epigonos of Telmessos; had a paternal first cousin called Antipater Epigonos and likely he had a paternal second cousin called Epigonos.

Through his father, Ptolemy II was a direct descendant of Lysimachus who was one of the Diadochi of the Greek King Alexander the Great who was King of Thrace, Asia Minor and Macedonia and Ptolemy I Soter another of the Diadochi of the Greek King Alexander the Great who was the founder of the Ptolemaic dynasty of Ancient Egypt and his wife, Berenice I of Egypt. Berenice I was the great-niece of the powerful Regent Antipater, through her maternal grandfather Cassander, the brother of Antipater.

== Life ==
Ptolemy II was born and raised in Telmessos in Lycia at an unknown date during his father's reign over Telmessos. His father Lysimachus ruled as the Ptolemaic Client King of Telmessos from February 240 BCE until his death in 206 BCE. Little is known on his early life prior to succeeding his father. When his father died in 206 BCE, Ptolemy II became the fourth and final ruler from the Lysimachid dynasty, which is also known as the Ptolemaic-Lysimachid dynasty in Lycia to rule the city. Ptolemy II also, was the third and final Ptolemaic Client King of Telmessos, as he ruled from 206 BCE until at least 181 BCE.

According to surviving inscriptions at Telmessos, Ptolemy II didn't seem to have a royal title nor is his relationship with the Pharaohs in Alexandria clear. It seems likely that his family had relative autonomy from Ptolemaic control increased. As Ptolemaic power declined rapidly and dramatically outside of Egypt after the death of Ptolemy III Euergetes in 222 BCE, probably Ptolemy II's father with his family had the motive and opportunity for divorcing themselves from Ptolemaic suzerainty. At an unknown date, during his father's reign, Lysimachus with his family were enjoying excellent, cordial relations with the Seleucid monarch Antiochus III the Great. Antiochus III, reigned from 222 BCE until 187 BCE, was an enemy of the Ptolemies and was, at the time, expanding Seleucid power in Asia Minor.

In 197 BCE, the region of Lycia was no longer under Ptolemaic control since it was under the occupation of Antiochus III. Ptolemy II became a Client King of Telmessos under Seleucid rule. By this time Ptolemy II was having excellent relations with Antiochus III revealing they had broken away from Ptolemaic influence, however there is a possibility their family connections with the Ptolemaic dynasty wasn't wholly broken.

The friendly relations between Ptolemy II and his family with Antiochus III is attested when in 193 BCE, his daughter Berenice, was appointed by Antiochus III as chief-priestess of the Carian Satrapy, of the Seleucid Royal Cult of Laodice. Laodice was a Seleucid Queen and the cousin-wife of Antiochus III. According to an intact stone inscription found in Nahavand Iran dated in 193 BCE, Ptolemy II is described as a relative of Antiochus III. This reflects his court title and in fact, Ptolemy II and Antiochus III are distantly related.

Below are two surviving letters translated from Greek regarding Ptolemy II's daughter chief-priestess appointment. The letters reveal his family's relations and status with Antiochus III. The first letter is from Antiochus III addressed to the Strategos of the Carian Satrapy and is the above-mentioned stone inscription from Nahavand, Iran:

King Antiochus to Anaximbrotos, greeting. As we desire to increase still further the honors of our sister Queen Laodice, and we think this most important for ourselves because she not only lives with us lovingly and considerately but is also reverently disposed towards the divine, we continue to do lovingly the things which it is fitting and right for her to receive from us and we have decided that just as there are appointed throughout the kingdom chief priests of us, (so) there are to be established [in] the same districts chief priestesses of her also, who shall war golden crowns bearing her [images] and who shall be mentioned in [the] contracts alter the chief priests of our [ancestors] and of us. Since, therefore, the in districts under your administration Berenice, the daughter of our relative Ptolemy (son) of Lysimachus, has been appointed, carry everything out according to what has been written above and have copies of the letters, inscribed on stelae, set up in the most conspicuous places, so that both now and in the future there may be evident to all in these matters also our policy towards our sister.

The second letter is addressed to the Hyparch of the district from the Strategos of the Carian satrapy:

[Anaxim]brotos to Dionytas, greeting. Enclosed is the copy of the decree written by the king concerning the appointment of Berenice, the daughter of Ptolemy son of Lysimachus, as chief priestess of the queen of the satrapy. Carry out (the matter) according to the instructions, just as he enjoins, and see to it that copies, inscribed on a stone stele, are set up in the most conspicuous place. Farewell. Year 119, Artemisios 19. [May 9 193 BC]

Around the time Berenice was appointed as chief-priestess, Ptolemy II sold part of his land holdings in the Telmessos region to Antiochus III. The reason for Antiochus III in purchasing part of Ptolemy II's land holdings were to settle Kardakian mercenaries near Telmessos. The Kardakian mercenaries were possible ancestors of the modern Kurds.

During the Treaty of Apamea in 188 BC, Antiochus III was forced to give the region of Lycia to the King Eumenes II of Pergamon. In the Treaty of Apamea, Ptolemy II's position was explicitly safeguarded. According to dedication inscriptions on the Greek island of Delos, Ptolemy II made offerings of thanks for the Peace of Apamea. This included an offering from Ptolemy II in association with his cousin Antipater Epigonos.

From 188 BCE until at least 181 BCE, Ptolemy II became a Client King under the rule of Eumenes II. His relationship with Eumenes II is unknown; but, probably, Ptolemy II sided with Rome as Eumenes II was an ally of Rome. Though Ptolemy II was able to retain his rule of Telmessos and his major land-holdings under Eumenes II, the family is not heard of thereafter.

== Sources ==
- Lysimachus’ article at Livius.org
- Ptolemaic Genealogy: Berenice I
- Ptolemaic Genealogy: Ptolemy "the Son"
- R.S. Bagnall, The administration of the Ptolemaic possessions outside Egypt, Brill Archive, 1976
- R.A. Billows, Kings and colonists: aspects of Macedonian imperialism, BRILL, 1995
- M.G. Cohen, The Hellenistic settlements in Europe, the Islands, and Asia Minor, University of California Press, 1995
- J.D. Grainger, A Seleukid prosopography and gazetteer, BRILL, 1997
- R.S. Bagnall & P. Derow, The Hellenistic Period: historical sources in translation, Wiley-Blackwell, 2004
