= Antigona =

Antigona may refer to:

- Antigona (Mysliveček), a 1773 opera by Josef Mysliveček
- Antigona (Traetta), a 1772 opera by Tommaso Traetta
- Antígona (Espriu play), a 1939 play by Salvador Espriu
- Antigona (Smole play), a 1960 play by Dominik Smole
- Antigona (bivalve), a genus of saltwater clams

== See also ==
- Antigona Furiosa (play), by Griselda Gambaro
- Antigonae, a 1949 opera by Carl Orff
- Antigonai, an opera based on fragments by Sophocles and Hölderlin for three choirs and a women's trio by Carlos Stella
- Antigone (disambiguation)
- Antigonea (disambiguation)
- Antigonia (disambiguation)
- Sinfonía de Antígona, the Symphony No. 1 by Carlos Chávez
