= Demetrius the Fair =

Hellenistic king of Cyrene

- Basileus

King of Cyrene
- Reign: 250–249 BC
- Predecessor: Magas and Berenice II
- Successor: Berenice II
- Co-regent: Berenice II
- Born: c.285 BC; Macedon
- Died: 249 BC; Cyrene
- Spouse: Olympias, Berenice II
- Issue: Antigonus III; Echecrates
- House: Antigonid dynasty, Ptolemaic dynasty (by marriage)
- Father: Demetrius of Macedon

Demetrius the Fair or the Handsome (Greek: Δημήτριος ὁ Καλός, c. 285 BC–249 BC), known in modern ancient historical sources as Demetrius of Cyrene, was a Hellenistic king of Cyrene, who succeeded Magas I.

== Family ==
Demetrius was of Macedonian ancestry. He was surnamed The Fair, because he was considered gorgeous by many of his contemporaries. He was born and raised in Macedonia. Demetrius was named after his father and was the youngest of the children of King Demetrius I of Macedon and his wife, Ptolemais. Demetrius I married Ptolemais as his fifth wife around 287 BC/286 BC in Miletus, while this was Ptolemais’ first marriage. Demetrius was the only child born into the marriage, as his father died shortly thereafter, in 283 BC. From his father's previous marriages, Demetrius had various paternal half siblings, who included king Antigonus II Gonatas, as well as Stratonice of Syria, princess and later Queen of the Seleucid Empire.

Demetrius’ maternal grandfather was the first Greek-Egyptian pharaoh Ptolemy I Soter. Among his maternal aunts were Queen Arsinoe II of Egypt and among his maternal uncles were Pharaoh Ptolemy II Philadelphus and Macedonian King Ptolemy Keraunos (Keraunos was Ptolemais’ full blooded brother). Pharaoh Ptolemy III Euergetes was a maternal cousin. His paternal grandparents were Macedonian king Antigonus I Monophthalmus and Stratonice, while his paternal uncle was the general Philip.

== Cyrenaica ==
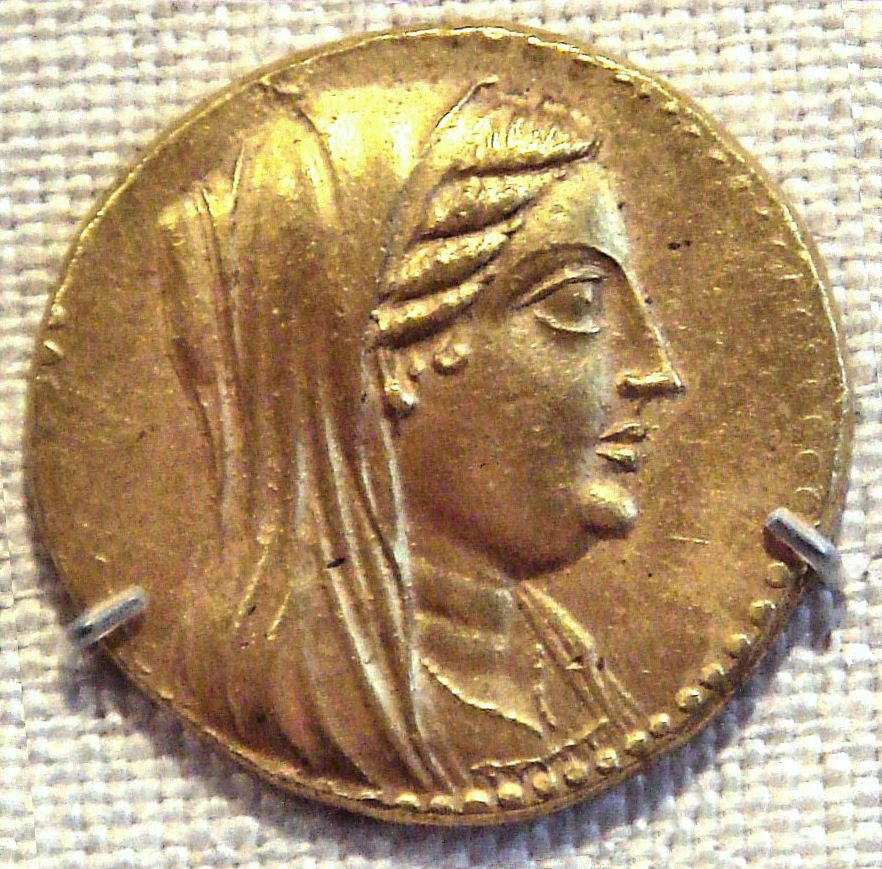
Berenice II was the daughter of Magas of Cyrene and became the wife of Demetrius, thus giving him the throne of Cyrenaica.

Not much is known about him until 249 BC. Greek Cyrenaean king Magas of Cyrene died in 249 BC or 250 BC. His widow was the powerful Greek monarch Apama II. She was Demetrius' niece through his paternal half sister Stratonice of Syria and her husband Antiochus I Soter of the Seleucid Empire.

Apama summoned Demetrius from Macedonia. She offered her daughter with Magas (her only child) Berenice II in marriage to Demetrius. Demetrius in return would become King of Cyrenaica and protect Cyrenaica from the Ptolemaic dynasty. Demetrius agreed to Apama's request and married Berenice. When he married Berenice and became king, there was no opposition in his rise to the throne, but he became ambitious to the point of recklessness.

Sometime after his marriage to Berenice, Demetrius and Apama became lovers. Jealous of her husband's affair with her mother, Berenice argued with both of them and consented to the assassination of Demetrius, who died in Apama's arms. The poem Coma Berenices by Greek poet Callimachus (lost, but known in a Latin translation or paraphrase by Catullus), apparently refers to her coup against Demetrius: "Let me remind you how stout-hearted you were even as a young girl: have you forgotten the brave deed by which you gained a royal marriage?"

== First marriage and children ==
Demetrius's first marriage was to an Olympias, a Greek noblewoman from Larissa, the daughter of a nobleman, Polycletus or Polyclitus of Larissa. She probably died before 249 BC. Their children were Antigonus III Doson, the later Macedonian King, and Echecrates, a nobleman about whom not much is known apart from the fact that he had a son whom he named after his brother Antigonus. A few months before his paternal second cousin King Philip V of Macedon’s death, Echecrates' son Antigonus revealed to Philip that Philip's son, the prince Perseus of Macedon, had made false accusations against his brother, Philip's other son, Demetrius, whom Philip had then had put to death. Philip, indignant at Perseus’ conduct appointed Antigonus as his successor. When Philip died in 179 BC and Antigonus became king, Perseus ousted Antigonus and had him executed.

== Ancestry ==
Ancestors of Demetrius the Fair

4. Antigonus I Monophthalmus, Basileus of Macedon
2. Demetrius I of Macedon
10. Corrhaeus
5. Stratonice
1. Demetrius the Fair, King of Cyrene
12. Lagus of Eordaea
6. Ptolemy I Soter, Pharaoh of Egypt
13. Arsinoe of Macedon
3. Ptolemais of Egypt
14. Antipater
7. Eurydice of Egypt

== See also ==
- Cyrene
- Cyrenaica
- List of Kings of Cyrene

== Sources ==
- "smith-bio/0198". ancientlibrary.com. Archived from the original on 2007-10-30.
- "Dictionary of Greek and Roman Biography and Mythology, page 965 (v. 1)". Archived from the original on 2006-11-25.
- "smith-bio/1110". ancientlibrary.com. Archived from the original on March 4, 2006.
- "smith-bio/2356". ancientlibrary.com. Archived from the original on 2007-10-21.
- "Antigonus III Doson". virtualreligion.net.
- "Berenice II". Archived from the original on 2008-02-18.
- "Ptolemais". Archived from the original on 2007-02-22.
- "www.tyndale.cam.ac.uk/Egypt/ptolemies/apama-arsinoe.htm#Arsinoe_Cyrene". tyndale.cam.ac.uk. Archived from the original on 2007-03-30.

Demetrius the Fair Died: 249 BC
Regnal titles
Preceded by Magas and Berenice II	King of Cyrene; 250 BC – 249 BC with Berenice II	Succeeded by Berenice II
