= Extra (newspaper) =

Brazilian newspaper based in Rio de Janeiro

- The information that you selected.
- Type: Daily newspaper
- Format: Broadsheet
- Owner: Grupo Globo
- Founder: Renato Maurício Prado
- Publisher: Infoglobo
- Editor: Octavio Guedes
- Staff writers: Maurício Lima
- Founded: April 1998; 28 years ago
- Language: Brazilian Portuguese
- Headquarters: Rua Irineu Marinho, 35 Rio de Janeiro, RJ 20230-023
- Country: Brazil
- Circulation: 135,000 (July 2015)
- Website: extra.globo.com

Extra is a Brazilian newspaper based in Rio de Janeiro, Brazil.

Founded in April 1998 by Infoglobo, the newspaper quickly became one of the best selling in the metropolitan region of Rio de Janeiro. Closing 2010 with an evolution of 12.97%, reaching 302,697 copies sold. With the success in the fluminenses banks, the Extra gains an online version (Extra Online). The site was redesigned with thematic pages, and soon was also successful in the network, with 6 million visitors. Extra is now one of the few newspapers focused on women, being 57% women and 43% men. Leading in the age group of 30 to 50 years.

The Extra is formed by 3 notebooks (Extra, Extra Game and Extra Session), dealing with different subjects. Extra Notebook – Rio 2016 and Carioca Championship – 3rd Notebook Extra Session – Television, Cinema, Show and Modern Life – In addition to the daily notebooks, the Extra has weekly notebooks.

Sunday: Extra Property – Offers, services and tips. Sunday: Extra Welfare – Health, education and family relationships. Tuesdays: Extra "Vida Ganha' – Employment, business and opportunities.

== Columnists ==
- Berenice Seara
- Gilmar Ferreira
- Eraldo Leite
- Dráuzio Varella
- Paulo Coelho
- Marcelo Rossi
- Ana Maria Braga
- Gérson
- Gustavo Nagib
- José Emílio Aguiar
- Ledio Carmona
- Aline Barros
