= TV Galo =

Television channel dedicated to Atlético Mineiro

- Country: Brazil
- Broadcast area: Brazil

Programming
- Language: Portuguese

Ownership
- Owner: Clube Atlético Mineiro

History
- Launched: 13 November 2007

Links
- Website: tvgalo.com.br

GaloTV, formerly TV Galo, is a free subscription-based, Internet channel and online media entirely dedicated to the Brazilian football team Atlético Mineiro. The channel offers Atlético's fans exclusive interviews with players and staff, in addition to coverage of training sessions and matches, footballing news, and other themed programming.

A project of the club's Multimedia Centre and Press Section, the channel was originally broadcast on cable television company NET, also with an online service through Atlético Mineiro's official website and YouTube. On 30 August 2015, Atlético announced some of the channel's content would also be broadcast in pay-per-view channel Premiere FC, before the club's live matches and during the week.

== Staff ==
- Emmerson Maurilio (Coordinator)
- Thiago Carodso
- Marco Aurélio Froes
- Guilherme D'Assumpção
