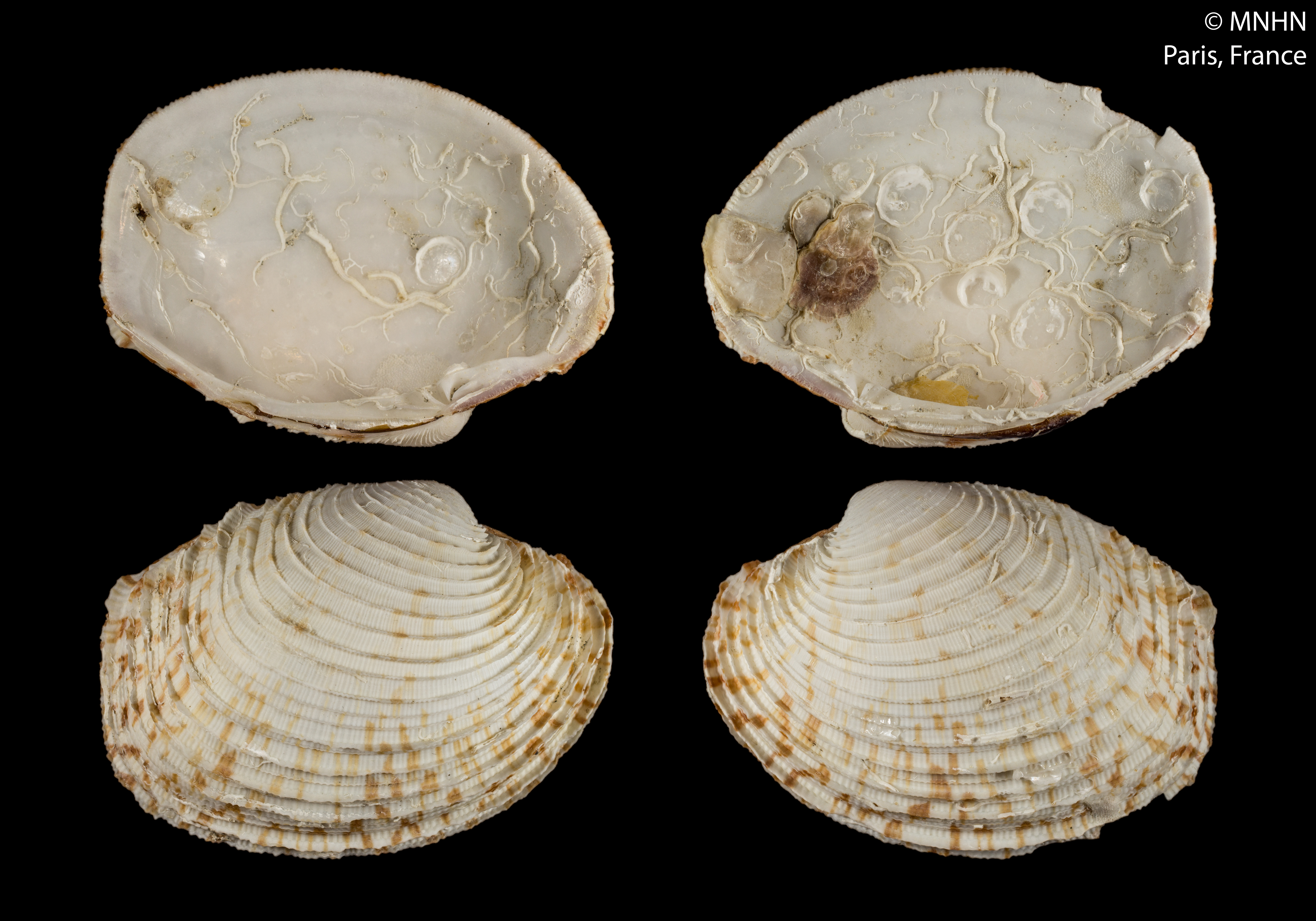
- Shell of Antigona somwangi (paratype at MNHN, Paris)

Scientific classification
- Kingdom: Animalia
- Phylum: Mollusca
- Class: Bivalvia
- Order: Venerida
- Superfamily: Veneroidea
- Family: Veneridae
- Genus: Antigona
- Species: A. somwangi

Binomial name
- Antigona somwangi M. Huber, 2010

= Antigona somwangi =

Species of bivalve

Antigona somwangi is a species of clam similar to the type specimen Antigona lamellaris, but the latter differs morphologically in terms of having somewhat pointed anterior and posterior ends, is smaller, is more boldly coloured (the exterior is more darkish and the interior in faded pinkish-orange) and the pallial sinus is relatively shorter about a quarter of shell length.

Distribution: Andaman Sea and Bay of Bengal.
