= Apama II =

3rd century BC consort of Magas of Cyrene

Apama II, sometimes known as Apame II (Ancient Greek: Ἀπάμα, about c. 292 BC–sometime after 249 BC) was a Syrian Greek princess of the Seleucid Empire, queen of Cyrenaica by marriage to King Magas of Cyrene.

== Life ==
Apama II was a daughter of the second Seleucid king Antiochus I Soter, who was of Greek Macedonian and Persian descent, and Stratonice, a queen of Greek Macedonian descent. Her siblings included Stratonice of Macedon and the Seleucid King Antiochus II Theos. Her paternal grandparents were the first Seleucid King Seleucus I Nicator and his wife Queen Apama I, and her maternal grandparents were Antigonid King Demetrius I of Macedon and his wife Queen Phila. Apama was the namesake of her paternal grandmother and paternal aunt. Apama was born and raised in the Seleucid Empire.

=== Queen of Cyrene ===
Around 275 BC, Apama married her maternal third cousin the Greek King Magas of Cyrene. The maternal grandmothers of Apama and Magas were paternal first cousins. The fathers of their grandmothers were brothers. Apama is sometimes known as Arsinoe. After she married Magas, there is a possibility Apama changed her name to Arsinoe, which was a more familiar Ptolemaic name. Apama was related to the Ptolemaic dynasty through marriage and was a distant relative of Eurydice of Egypt and Berenice I of Egypt, who were among the various wives of Ptolemy I Soter.

Although her marriage to Magas was a dynastic one, Antiochus I arranged this marriage to occur as a part of a political alliance between him and Magas to invade Egypt. Through her marriage to Magas, Apama became Queen of Cyrenaica. In Cyrenaica, there is a surviving honorific inscription dedicated to Apama, as a monarch and wife of Magas.

After 270 BC, Apama bore Magas a daughter called Berenice II, who would be their only known child. In 250 BC, Magas and Apama had betrothed Berenice II to her paternal cousin and Ptolemaic prince Ptolemy III Euergetes. Magas and the father of Ptolemy III, were maternal half brothers.

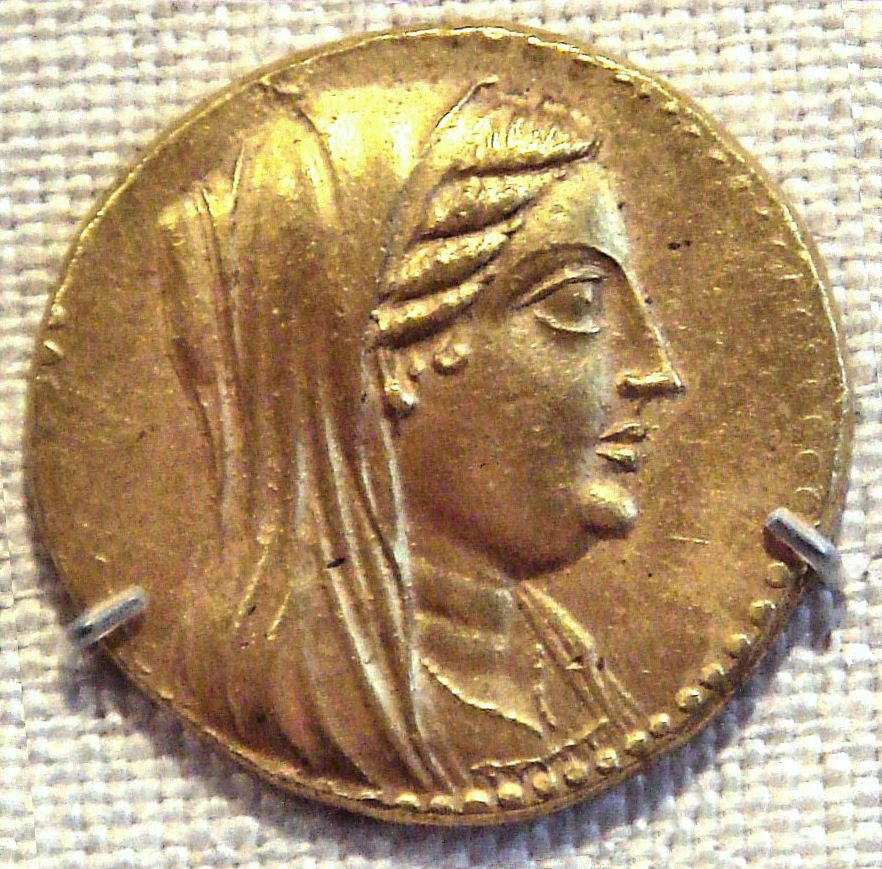
Berenice II, daughter of Apama II, on a coin from the ring of Ptolemy III.

=== Reign of daughter ===
Either in 250 BC or 249 BC, Magas had died. Apama had become a widow and powerful in Cyrene as the mother of the heiress of Cyrene, her daughter Berenice. In order to protect Cyrenaica from the Ptolemaic dynasty, Apama summoned her maternal uncle the Greek Macedonian prince Demetrius the Fair to Cyrenaica. Apama offered Demetrius her daughter in marriage to him; in return he would become king. Demetrius agreed to his niece’s request and married her daughter. When Demetrius became king, there was no opposition in his rise to the throne, but he became ambitious to the point of recklessness.

Sometime after Demetrius married his great niece, Apama and Demetrius became lovers. Berenice became jealous of her mother’s affair with her husband. She argued with both her mother and her husband and led a coup against Demetrius who died in Apama’s arms. The poem Coma Berenices by Greek poet Callimachus (lost, but known in a Latin translation or paraphrase by Catullus), apparently refers to her supporters killing of Demetrius: "Let me remind you how stout-hearted you were even as a young girl: have you forgotten the brave deed by which you gained a royal marriage?"

After the death of Demetrius, Cyrenaica became a part of the Ptolemaic Empire. Berenice II left Cyrenaica and travelled to Egypt where she married her cousin Ptolemy III and through her marriage became Queen of Egypt. Apama's ultimate fate is unknown. It is possible she travelled with Berenice II to Alexandria, where eventually she settled with her daughter and her family.

== Sources ==
- Heckel W., Who’s who in the age of Alexander the Great: prosopography of Alexander’s empire, Wiley-Blackwell, 2006
- https://www.livius.org/ap-ark/apame/apame_ii.html
- http://www.virtualreligion.net/iho/antigonus_3.html
- https://www.livius.org/be-bm/berenice/berenice_ii.html
- http://www.tyndalehouse.com/egypt/ptolemies/berenice_i_fr.htm
- https://web.archive.org/web/20110716100103/http://www.tyndalehouse.com/egypt/ptolemies/apama-arsinoe_fr.htm
