= Berenicidae =

Berenicidae or Berenikidai (Ancient Greek: Βερενικίδαι) was a deme of ancient Attica, of the tribe of Ptolemais, sending one delegate to the Athenian Boule. It was established in 224/3 BCE and named after Berenice II of Egypt, wife of Ptolemy II, after whom the tribe was named.

Its site is unlocated, but probably near Eleusis, as inscriptions referring to the place have been found in the vicinity.
