= Echecrates =

In ancient Greece, Echecrates (Greek: Ἐχεκράτης) was the name of the following men:

- Echecrates of Thessaly, a military officer of Ptolemy IV Philopator, documented around 219–217 BC.
- A son of Demetrius the Fair (c. 285–250 BC) by Olympias of Larissa, and brother of Antigonus III Doson. He had a son named Antigonus after his uncle.
- Three Pythagorean philosophers mentioned by Iamblichus:
  - A Locrian, one of those to whom Plato is said to have gone for instruction. The name Caetus in Valerius Maximus is perhaps an erroneous reading for Echecrates.
  - A Tarentine, probably the same who is mentioned in Plato's Ninth Letter.
  - Echecrates of Phlius, a contemporary with Aristoxenus the Peripatetic.
