= Lysimachus of Telmessos =

Lysimachus of Telmessos (Ancient Greek: Λυσίμαχος Τελμησσεύς, romanized: Lysimachos Telmēsseus, flourished 3rd century BC), also known as Lysimachus II, was a Greek Prince from Asia Minor who served as a Ptolemaic Client King under the Ptolemaic dynasty of Ancient Egypt.

== Family background ==
Lysimachus was the first-born son and heir of Ptolemy I Epigone by an unnamed Greek aristocratic mother and had a younger brother called Epigonos of Telmessos. Lysimachus’ father Ptolemy, was a Greek Prince who through marriage and adoption was to be the first intended heir of the Pharaoh Ptolemy II Philadelphus. Lysimachus through his father, was a relation to three of the Diadochi of the Greek King Alexander the Great: Lysimachus, Ptolemy I Soter and the powerful Regent Antipater.

Lysimachus was the namesake of two people in his father’s family: his paternal grandfather, Thessalian Lysimachus who was King of Thrace, Asia Minor and Macedonia and his late paternal uncle of the same name, Lysimachus. He had a paternal cousin also called, Lysimachus of Egypt one of the sons born to Ptolemy II from his first wife, Lysimachus’ paternal aunt Arsinoe I.

His paternal grandmother was Arsinoe II, a Ptolemaic Greek Macedonian Princess who married his paternal grandfather as his third wife who later married her full-blooded brother Ptolemy II Philadelphus as her third husband and through marriage became Queen of the Ptolemaic Kingdom. Arsinoe II was a daughter born to Ptolemy I Soter and Berenice I of Egypt. Ptolemy I was the founder of the Ptolemaic dynasty of Ancient Egypt and Berenice I was the great-niece of the powerful Regent Antipater, through her maternal grandfather Cassander, the brother of Antipater.

== Life ==
Lysimachus was born at an unknown date either in his father’s co-regency of the Ptolemaic Kingdom with Ptolemy II in Alexandria Egypt which was from 267 BC until 259 BC or when his father was the first Ptolemaic Client King of Telmessos in Lycia. His father ruled Telmessos from late 259 BC until his death in February 240 BC. Little is known about his early life prior to succeeding his father.

Lysimachus probably succeeded his father, not so long after the death of his father and after his father was honored by a decree from Ptolemy III Euergetes. When his father was honored by Ptolemy III in his decree to Telmessos, Lysimachus had a Greek Macedonian friend honored called Aristeas Kleandrou, who was given privileges in the Telmessian decree in accordance from a request in a letter that he had written. Lysimachus was the third ruler from the Lysimachid dynasty, which is also known as the Ptolemaic-Lysimachid dynasty in Lycia to rule the city. He was a contemporary to the rule of his paternal first cousin Ptolemy III Euergetes who ruled from 246 BC till 222 BC and one of the sons and heir of Ptolemy III, Ptolemy IV Philopator who ruled from 222 BC till 204 BC. He ruled as the second Ptolemaic Client King of Telmessos from 240 BC until he died in 206 BC.

According to surviving inscriptions at Telmessos, Lysimachus didn’t seem to have a royal title nor it is clear his relationship with the Pharaohs in Alexandria, however it seems that Lysimachus recognised the rule of Ptolemy III’s authority in Alexandria. It seems likely that Lysimachus had his relative autonomy from Ptolemaic control increased. As Ptolemaic power declined rapidly and dramatically outside of Egypt after the death of Ptolemy III in 222 BC, probably Lysimachus and his family had the motive and opportunity for divorcing themselves from Ptolemaic suzerainty. At an unknown date during his reign, Lysimachus and his family were enjoying excellent cordial relations with the Seleucid monarch Antiochus III the Great. Antiochus III reigned from 222 BC until 187 BC, was an enemy of the Ptolemies who was at the time expanding Seleucid power in Asia Minor. When Lysimachus died, he was succeeded by Ptolemy II of Telmessos, his son and successor by an unnamed Greek woman.

== Sources ==
- Lysimachus’ article at Livius.org
- Ptolemaic Genealogy: Berenice I
- Ptolemaic Genealogy: Arsinoe I
- Ptolemaic Genealogy: Arsinoe II
- Ptolemaic Genealogy: Ptolemy "the Son"
- Ptolemy ‘the Son’ Reconsidered: Are there too many Ptolemies?, Jennifer Ann Tunny, University of Queensland, 2000
- R.S. Bagnall, The administration of the Ptolemaic possessions outside Egypt, Brill Archive, 1976
- R.A. Billows, Kings and colonists: aspects of Macedonian imperialism, BRILL, 1995
