= Berenice (Oxyrhynchus) =

Roman Egyptian wine merchant

Berenice (1st century – 2nd century AD) was a wine merchant in Roman Egypt.

She is one of the people attested in the famous Oxyrhynchus Papyri, and has been the subject of scientific research. She is attested from papyri from 90 AD, 106 AD and 109. She was married to the wealthy wine merchant Pasion of Oxyrhynchus. During or after her marriage, she was active as a successful wine merchant. She was both literate and wealthy. She is known for the documented process against her business partner, the wine merchant Apion.
