= Berenice Seara =

Brazilian journalist

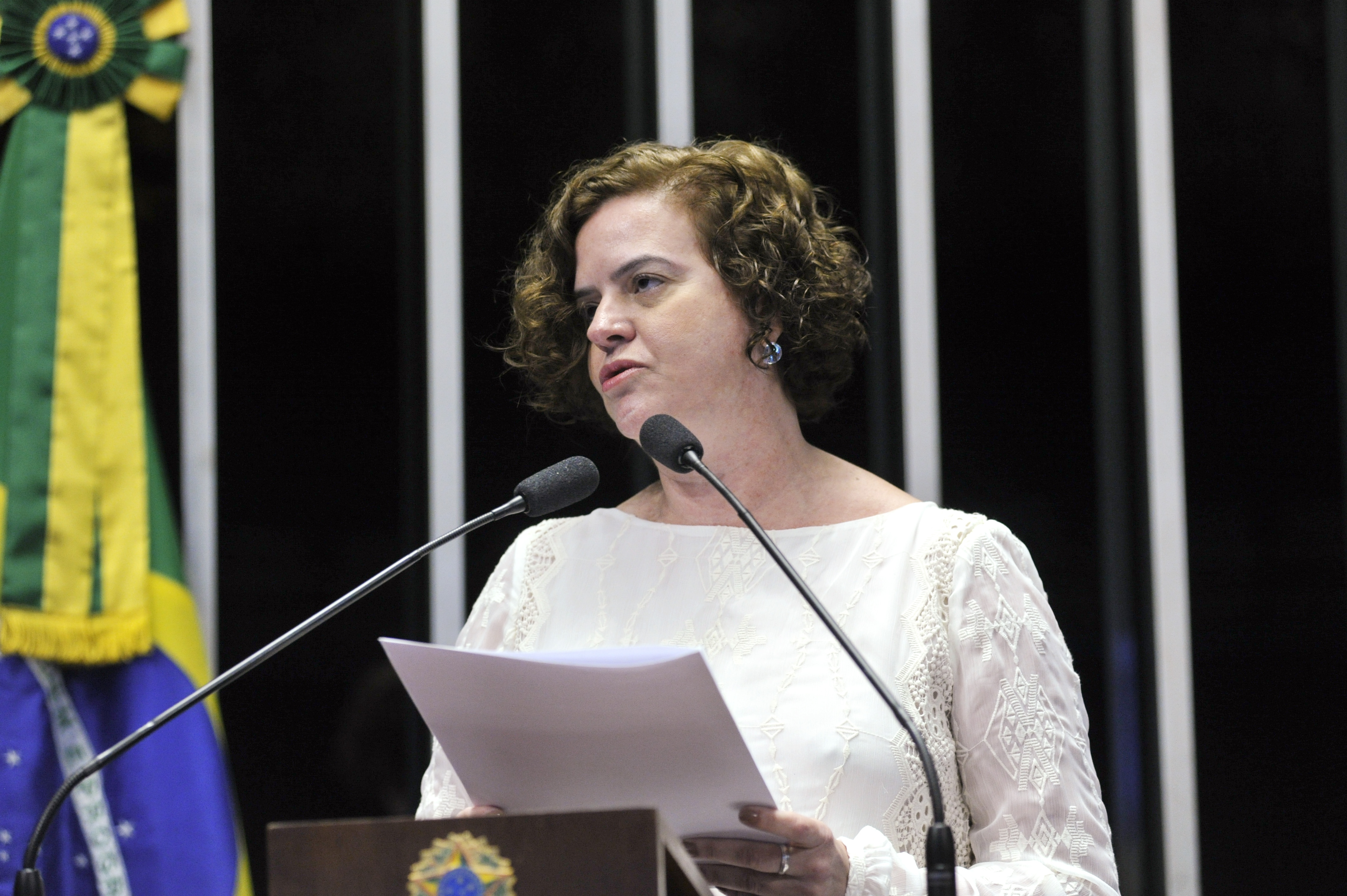
- Berenice Seara in 2015 at the Federal Senate of Brazil
- Born: Rio de Janeiro, Rio de Janeiro, Brazil
- Citizenship: Brazilian
- Education: Fluminense Federal University
- Occupation: Journalist
- Awards: Roberto Marinho Award for Journalistic Merit (2015)

Berenice Seara is a Brazilian journalist. She became known for her column Extra, Extra! in the newspaper Extra and for her radio commentary on CBN.

== Biography ==
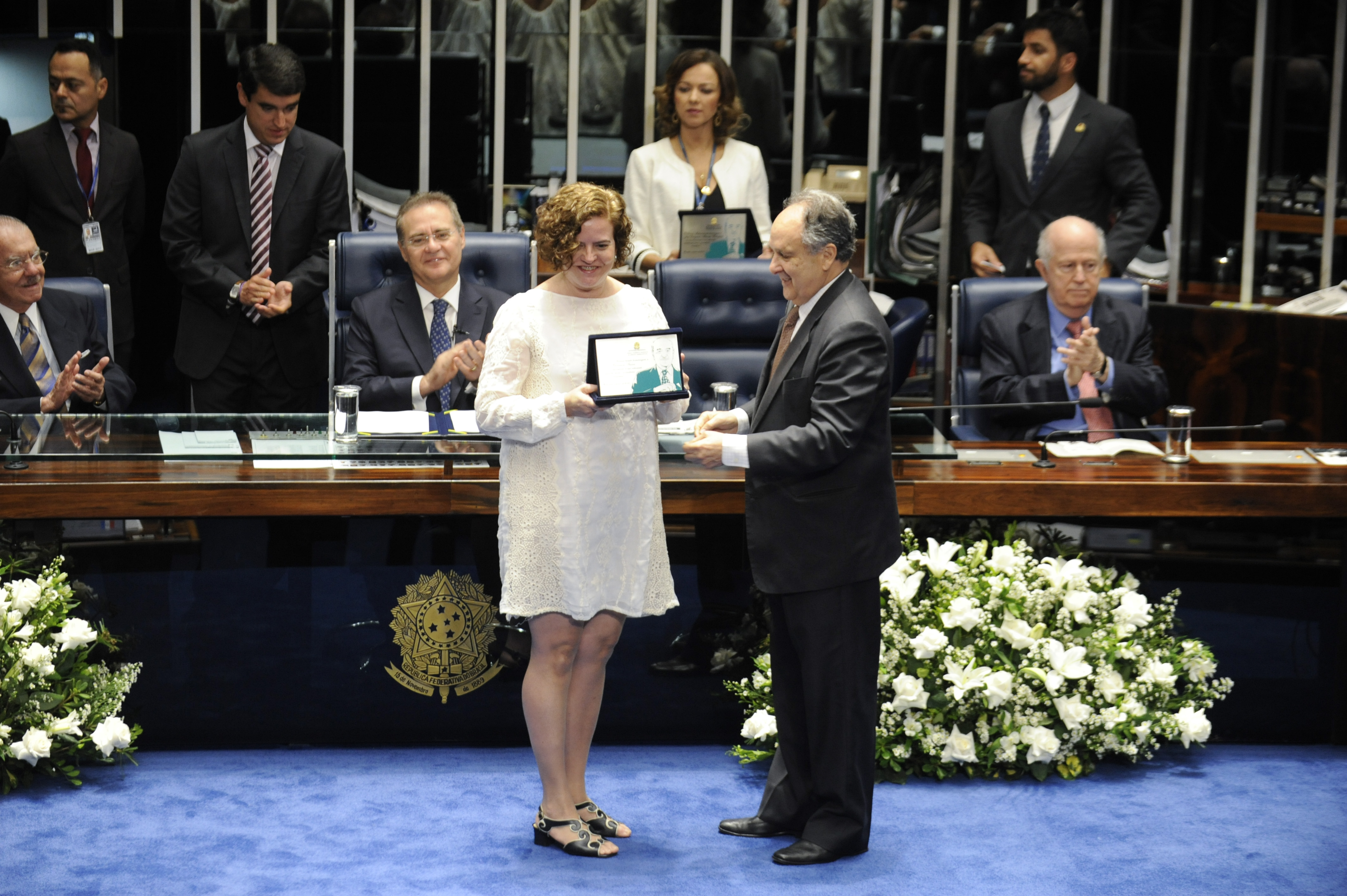
Berenice Seara, in 2015, at the Federal Senate, receiving the Roberto Marinho Award for Journalistic Merit, alongside Senator Cristovam Buarque (PDT)

Berenice was born in the city of Rio de Janeiro. She earned a degree in journalism from the Fluminense Federal University (UFF). She began her journalism career in the section of the newspaper O Globo dedicated to covering daily life in Rio de Janeiro. After a stint at Grupo Globo, she moved to Jornal do Brasil, where she continued to cover daily life in Rio de Janeiro.

In 2004, he founded the column Extra, Extra!, dedicated to covering Rio de Janeiro state politics in the newspaper Extra, which became one of the publication’s leading columns.

In 2012, he began providing commentary on the Extra, Extra! column on CBN, through the program CBN Rio, offering brief insights into Rio de Janeiro state politics.

In 2015, she was awarded the Roberto Marinho Prize for Journalistic Merit, an honor bestowed by the Brazilian Federal Senate. The ceremony was presided over by Renan Calheiros (PMDB) and attended by former President José Sarney (PMDB), where Berenice was one of the recipients of the award, along with journalists Gerson Camarotti and José Brayner.

In 2023, she was fired from Grupo Globo after more than three decades with the company, along with radio host and journalist Carlos Andreazza, with whom she co-hosted the program CBN Rio. The following year, she was one of the founders of the news portal Tempo Real RJ, which provides news coverage of Rio de Janeiro.

== Honors ==
- Roberto Marinho Award for Journalistic Merit, presented by the Brazilian Federal Senate in 2015.
