= Antigonus (sculptor) =

Antigonus (Ancient Greek: Ἀντίγονος) was a sculptor of ancient Greece, and an eminent writer upon his art, was one of the artists who represented the battles of Attalus I and Eumenes against the Gauls. He lived, therefore, about 239 BCE, when Attalus I, king of Pergamus, conquered the Gauls. According to Pliny, Antigonus sculpted statues of Harmodius and Aristogeiton, and a "Perixyomenos" – probably a sculpture of a man scraping himself. He may have been the same Antigonus who wrote on the art of painting and was mentioned by Diogenes Laërtius.
