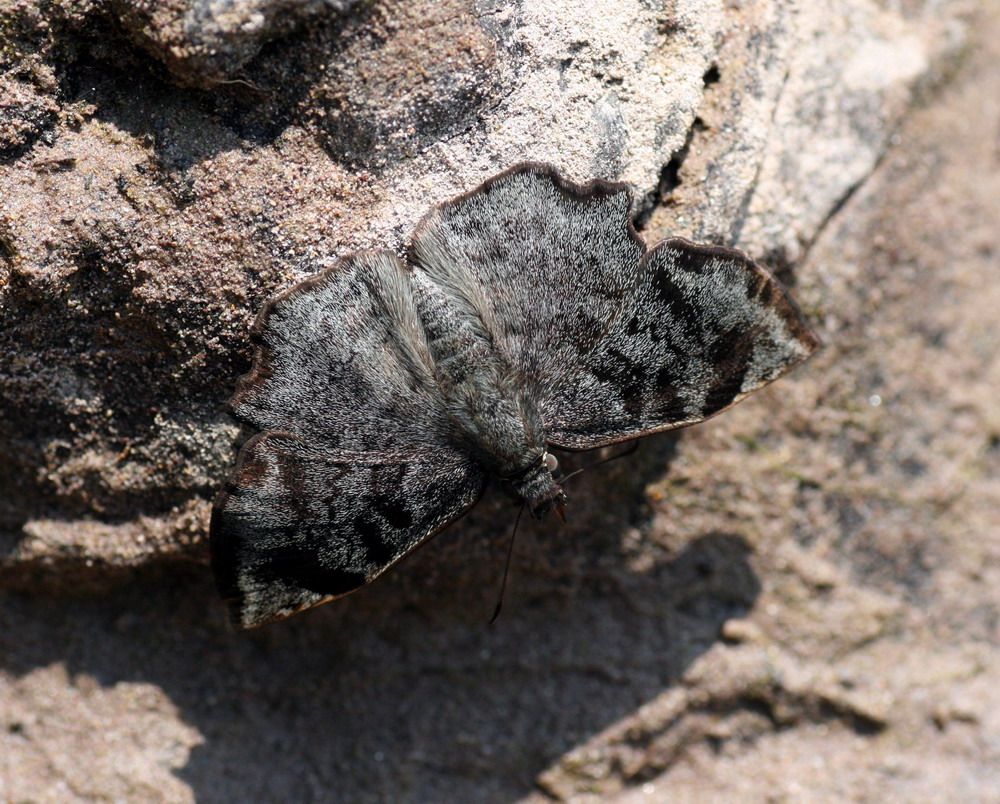
- Antigonus erosus

Scientific classification
- Kingdom: Animalia
- Phylum: Arthropoda
- Class: Insecta
- Order: Lepidoptera
- Family: Hesperiidae
- Genus: Antigonus; Hübner, [1819]

= Antigonus (butterfly) =

Genus of butterflies

Antigonus is a genus of skippers in the family Hesperiidae.

== Species ==
Recognised species in the genus Antigonus include:

- Antigonus emorsa Felder, 1869
- Antigonus erosus Hübner, [1812]
- Antigonus nearchus Latreille, [1817]
