= Antigonus of Cumae =

Antigonus (Ancient Greek: Ἀντίγονος) of Cumae in Magna Graecia was an ancient Greek writer on agriculture, who is referred to by Pliny, Varro, and Columella, but whose age is unknown.
