= Ledio Carmona =

Brazilian sports journalist

- Born: Ledio Carmona; May 6, 1965 (age 61); Niterói, Rio de Janeiro, Brazil
- Citizenship: Brazil
- Education: Pontifical Catholic University of Rio de Janeiro
- Occupations: sports journalist commentator
- Years active: 1986–present
- Employer: SporTV
- Television: SporTV

Ledio Carmona (May 6, 1965) is a Brazilian sports journalist.; He is currently a commentator for SporTV, where he works on soccer game broadcasts and also appears on shows such as Seleção SporTV and Troca de Passes.

== Biography ==
=== First years and education ===
Ledio was born in Niterói, in the Rio de Janeiro metropolitan area, in 1965. He moved to the city of Rio de Janeiro to study journalism at the Pontifical Catholic University of Rio de Janeiro (PUC-Rio).

=== Career ===
He began working at Jornal do Brasil during 1986 FIFA World Cup, alongside João Saldanha and Sandro Moreyra. He later joined Placar magazine as a reporter and rose to the position of editor. He also worked at the daily newspaper Lance! before moving to O Globo newspaper.

Since 2001, he has served as a soccer commentator for SporTV. He had a blog on the SporTV website until early 2009, when it was replaced by “Ledio's blog,” hosted on the Globoesporte.com portal.

He has been on-site for the last ten World Cups, starting in 1990 FIFA World Cup, in Italy. He has also provided on-site coverage of other major soccer tournaments, including the UEFA European Championship, the FIFA Confederations Cup, and the FIFA Club World Cup.

== Personal life ==
Of Italian descent, he is a CR Vasco da Gama fan. He said that his greatest soccer idol was the forward Roberto Dinamite, in whose honor he named his first son Roberto. He is married to Germana Costa Moura, who is also a journalist, and they have two sons, Roberto and Miguel. His friends call him “Dom Carmo.”

In May 2026, the press room at the Moacyr Barbosa Training Center, CR Vasco's training facility located in Jacarepaguá, Rio de Janeiro, was named after Ledio in his honor.

In an Instagram post, he commented, “I became a person with a disability in 2012. I lost the ability to walk like everyone else walks, to run like everyone else runs—you know,” without mentioning what had caused his condition. In 2016, Ledio lost almost all of his vision in his left eye. He was diagnosed with severe sepsis and septic shock in late March 2026, with episodes of high fever. He had to be rushed to the hospital in Rio de Janeiro, where he remained under medical supervision, but was discharged after a few days to continue treatment at home. He experienced tachycardia while he was hospitalized, but the medical team brought it under control.

== Books ==
- Brasileiros Olímpicos (w/ Tiago Petrik and Jorge Luiz Rodrigues) São Paulo: Panda Books;
- Almanaque do Futebol Sportv (w/ Gustavo Poli) Rio de Janeiro: Casa da Palavra, 2009
- Livro-Jogo das Copas (w/ Marcelo Martinez) Rio de Janeiro: Editora Globo, 2010.
