= Antigonus of Alexandria =

Antigonus (Ancient Greek: Ἀντίγονος) of Alexandria was a grammarian of ancient Greece who is referred to by Erotian in his Prooemium and his Prenira. He is perhaps the same person as the Antigonus of whom the Scholiast on Nicander speaks, and identical with Antigonus, the commentator of Hippocrates.
