= Antigonus (physician) =

Ancient Greek physician

Antigonus (Ancient Greek: Ἀντίγονος) was an ancient Greek army surgeon, mentioned by Galen, who must therefore have lived in or before the second century CE. Marcellus Empiricus quotes a physician of the same name, who may very possibly be the same person; and Lucian mentions an impudent quack named Antigonus, who among other things, said that one of his patients had been restored to life after having been buried for twenty days.
