= Epigonus of Telmessos =

Epigonus of Telmessos (Ancient Greek: Επίγονος Τελμησσεύς, romanized: Epigonos Telmēsseus, flourished 3rd century BC) was a Greek prince from Asia Minor.

== Family background ==
Epigonus may have been a second-born son to Ptolemy I Epigone and younger brother Lysimachus of Telmessos, but this is disputed. Ptolemy Epigone was the initial heir of Ptolemy II Philadelphus and was related to three of the Diadochi of Alexander the Great: Lysimachus, Ptolemy I Soter and the powerful Regent Antipater.

== Life ==
Little is known about the life of Epigonus, as he was a part of the Lysimachid dynasty, which is also known as the Ptolemaic-Lysimachid dynasty in Lycia in ruling the city of Telmessos. He was born at an unknown date either in his father’s co-regency of the Ptolemaic Kingdom with Ptolemy II in Alexandria Egypt which was from 267 BC until 259 BC or when his father was the first Ptolemaic client king of Telmessos in Lycia. His father ruled Telmessos from late 259 BC until his death in February 240 BC. and his brother Lysimachus succeeded their father as the second Ptolemaic client king of Telmessos who ruled from early 240 BC until his death in 206 BC.

Epigonus name means "heir" in Greek. It had been used as an epithet by his possible father, Ptolemy I. Epigonus is only known from inscriptions from Telmessos and dedicatory inscriptions from the Greek island of Delos.

As his family likely had relative autonomy from Ptolemaic control increased and Ptolemaic power declined rapidly and dramatically outside of Egypt after the death of Ptolemy III Euergetes in 222 BC, probably Epigonus with his family had the motive and opportunity for divorcing themselves from Ptolemaic suzerainty. At an unknown date, Epigonus with his brother and their families were enjoying excellent cordial relations with the Seleucid monarch Antiochus III the Great. Antiochus III reigned from 222 BC until 187 BC, was an enemy of the Ptolemies who was at the time expanding Seleucid power in Asia Minor. By a wife whose name is unknown, he had a son named Antipater.

== Sources ==
- Lysimachus’ article at Livius.org
- Ptolemaic Genealogy: Berenice I
- Ptolemaic Genealogy: Arsinoe II
- Ptolemaic Genealogy: Ptolemy "the Son"
- Ptolemy ‘the Son’ Reconsidered: Are there too many Ptolemies?, Jennifer Ann Tunny, University of Queensland, 2000
- R.S. Bagnall, The administration of the Ptolemaic possessions outside Egypt, Brill Archive, 1976
- R.A. Billows, Kings and colonists: aspects of Macedonian imperialism, BRILL, 1995
