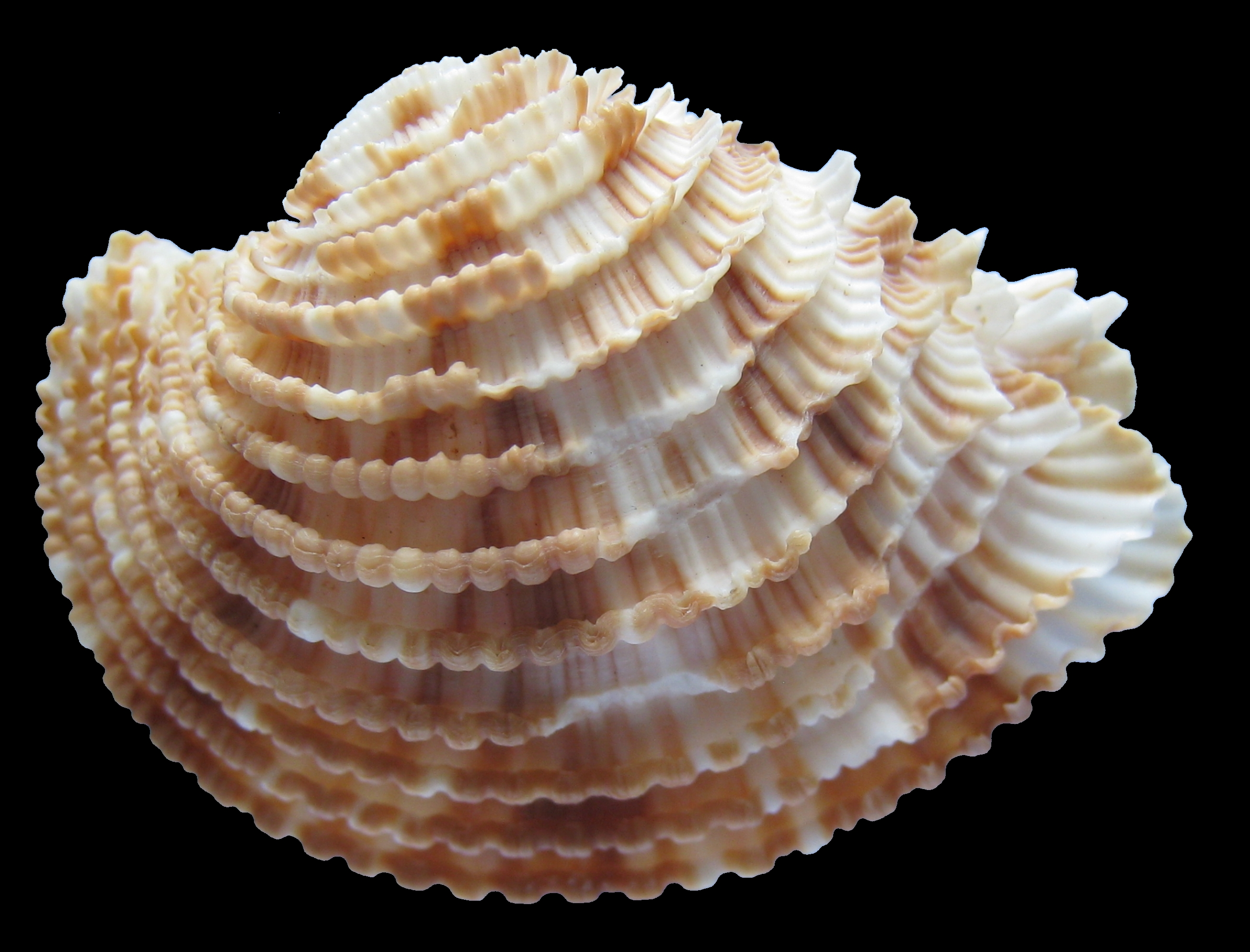
- Antigona lamellaris

Scientific classification
- Domain: Eukaryota
- Kingdom: Animalia
- Phylum: Mollusca
- Class: Bivalvia
- Order: Venerida
- Superfamily: Veneroidea
- Family: Veneridae
- Genus: Antigona; Schumacher, 1817

Species
- See text.

Synonyms
- Chione (Omphaloclathrum) Mörch, 1853; Omphaloclathrum Mörch, 1853 (objective synonym of Antigiona); Tigammona Iredale, 1930

= Antigona (bivalve) =

Genus of bivalves

Antigona is a genus of saltwater clams, marine bivalve molluscs in the family Veneridae, the venus clams.

== Species ==
- Antigona chemnitzii (Hanley, 1845)
- Antigona gladstonensis (Angas, 1872)
- Antigona koonpoi Thach, 2023
- Antigona lacerata (Hanley, 1845)
- Antigona lamellaris Schumacher, 1817
- Antigona laqueata (G. B. Sowerby II, 1853)
- Antigona magnifica (Hanley, 1845)
- Antigona nghiai Thach, 2023
- † Antigona pernitida N. H. Woods, 1931
- Antigona persimilis (Iredale, 1930)
- Antigona resticulata (G. B. Sowerby II, 1853)
- Antigona somwangi M. Huber, 2010
- Antigona sowerbyi (Deshayes, 1854)
- Antigona vietnamensis Thach, 2023

Synonyms

- Antigona elimatula (Darragh, 2010: synonym of Proxichione elimatula Darragh, 2010
