= Antigonus (historian) =

Greek historian

Antigonus (Ancient Greek: Ἀντίγονος) was a Greek historian.

Antigonus wrote a history of Rome. It has been speculated that this historian and the "King Antigonus" mentioned by Plutarch, are one and the same.
