= Berenice II =

Queen regnant of Cyrenaica from 258 to 246 BCE

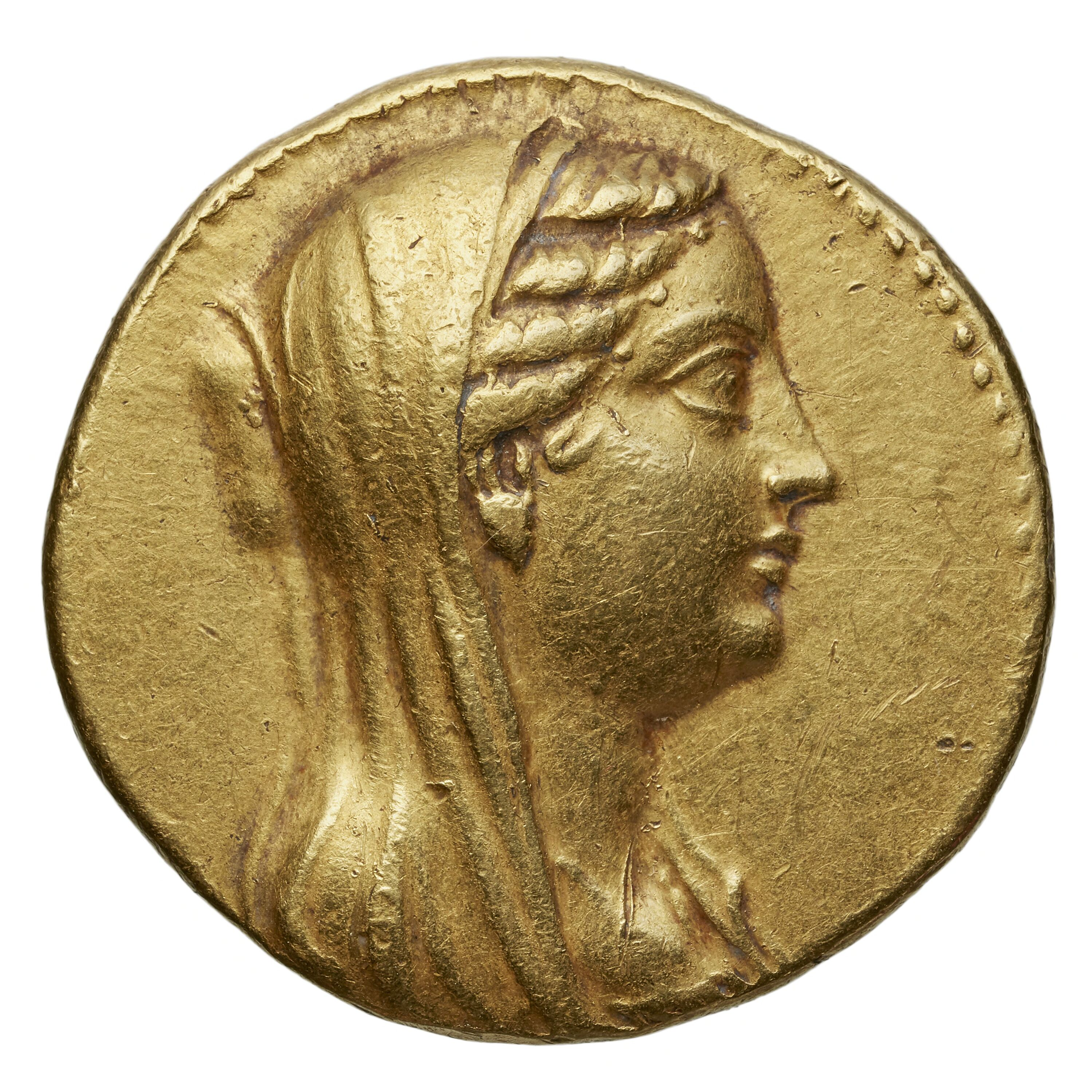
- Octodrachm of Berenice II

Queen regnant of Cyrenaica
- Reign: 258–247/246 BCE
- Predecessor: Magas
- Successor: Annexed by Ptolemaic Kingdom
- Co-rulers: Magas (until 250 BCE); Demetrius the Fair (250–249 BCE)
- Contender: Koinon (249–246 BCE)

Queen consort of Egypt (Note: Berenice was granted pharaonic titulary, but was not recognized as sovereign by Hellenistic administration of the country, making her status as Pharaoh ambiguous.)
- Tenure: 246–221 B.C.E.

Vizier
- Born: c. 267/266 BCE
- Died: 221 BCE (aged 45 or 46)
- Spouse: Demetrius the Fair; Ptolemy III Euergetes
- Issue: Ptolemy IV; Arsinoe III; Alexander; Magas of Egypt; Berenice
Names
Royal titulary
Horus name
Satheqa Iretenheqa
The King's Daughter, Created by the King
G5	q HqA t G38 t D4 t n q HqA t H8
Prenomen
Bereniket Meritnetjerou
Berenice Euergetes, the Goddess, Beloved of the Gods

M23 X1 L2 X1	b i rw n i i W11 A t H8
- Dynasty: Ptolemaic
- Father: Magas of Cyrene
- Mother: Apama II

Berenice II Euergetis (267 or 266 – 221 BCE; Greek: Βερενίκη Ευεργέτις, Berenikē Euergetis, "Berenice the Benefactress") was queen regnant of Cyrenaica from 258 to 246 BCE and queen of Ptolemaic Egypt from 246 to 222 BCE as the wife of Ptolemy III. She is sometimes considered co-regent of her Ptolemaic husband.

She married Demetrius the Fair, thus giving him the throne of Cyrenaica, on the death of her father Magas in 250/249 BCE. After a short power struggle with her mother, Berenice married her half-cousin Ptolemy III, the third ruler of the Ptolemaic kingdom. This marriage led to the re-incorporation of Cyrenaica into the Ptolemaic empire. As queen of Egypt, Berenice participated actively in government, was incorporated into the Ptolemaic state cult alongside her husband and worshipped as a goddess in her own right. She is best known for sacrificing her hair as a votive offering, which led to the constellation Coma Berenices being named after her. Berenice was murdered by the regent Sosibius shortly after the accession of her son Ptolemy IV Philopator in 221 BCE.

== Life ==
Cyrenaica had been incorporated into the Ptolemaic realm in 323 BCE, by Ptolemy I Soter shortly after the death of Alexander the Great. The region proved difficult to control and around 300 BCE, Ptolemy I entrusted the region to Magas, son of his wife Berenice I by an earlier marriage. After Ptolemy I's death, Magas asserted his independence and engaged in warfare with his successor Ptolemy II Philadelphus. Around 275 BCE, Magas married Apama, who came from the Seleucid dynasty, which had become enemies of the Ptolemies. Berenice II was their only child. When Ptolemy II renewed his efforts to reach a settlement with Magas of Cyrene in the late 250s BCE, it was agreed that Berenice would be married to her half-cousin, the future Ptolemy III, who was Ptolemy II's heir.

The astronomer Gaius Julius Hyginus claims that when Berenice's father and his troops were routed in battle, Berenice mounted a horse, rallied the remaining forces, killed many of the enemy, and drove the rest to retreat. The veracity of this story is unclear and the battle in question is not otherwise attested, but "it is not on the face of it impossible."

=== Queen of Cyrene ===
Berenice was hailed basilissa (queen) on coins even in her father's lifetime. There are Cyrenean coins with the portrait of queen, the legend ΒΕΡΕΝΙΚΗΣ ΒΑΣΙΛΙΣΣΗΣ (Berenice Basilissa), and the monogram of Magas. It is evidently more plausible that the queen's identity is Magas's daughter Berenice II rather than Magas's mother Berenice I, because the portrait is youthful and unveiled, meaning unmarried. According to coins of Berenice, the accession of Berenice as queen of Cyrene was in 258 BCE.

King Magas died in circa 250 BCE. At this point, Berenice's mother Apama refused to honour the marriage agreement with the Ptolemies and invited an Antigonid prince, Demetrius the Fair to Cyrene to marry Berenice instead. With Apama's help, Demetrius seized control of the city. Allegedly, Demetrius and Apama became lovers. Berenice is said to have discovered them in bed together and had him assassinated. Apama was spared. After Demetrius' assassination Cyrene was engulfed in civil unrest, and the control of Cyrene was entrusted to a republican government (Koinon), led by two Cyrenaeans named Ecdelus and Demophanes, until Berenice's actual wedding to Ptolemy III in 246 BCE after his accession to the throne.

=== Queen of Egypt ===
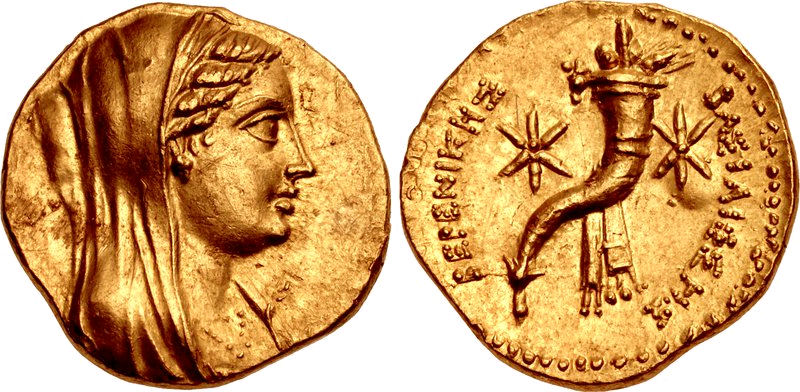
Coin of Berenice II

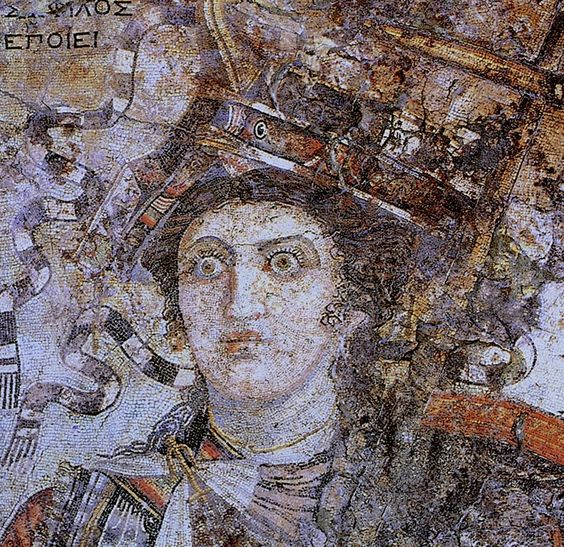
A mosaic from Thmuis (Mendes), Egypt, created by the Hellenistic artist Sophilos (signature) in about 200 BCE, now in the Greco-Roman Museum in Alexandria, Egypt; the woman depicted is probably Berenice II. Her crown showing a ship's prow and her anchor-shaped brooch symbolised the Ptolemaic Empire's naval prowess.

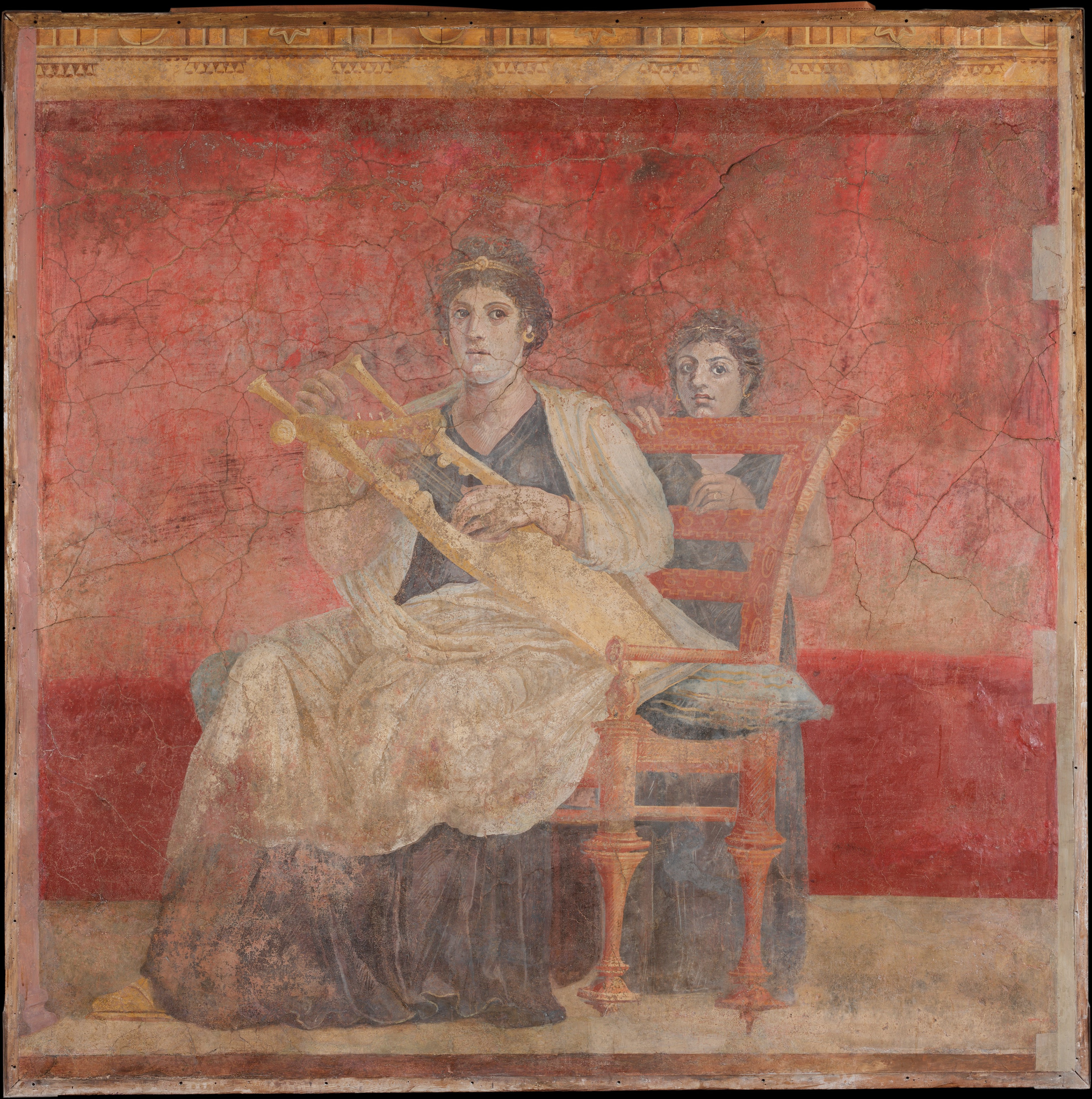
A seated woman in a fresco from the Roman Villa Boscoreale, dated mid-1st century BCE, that likely represents Berenice II of Ptolemaic Egypt wearing a stephane (i.e. royal diadem) on her head

Berenice married Ptolemy III in 246 BCE after his accession to the throne. This brought Cyrenaica back into the Ptolemaic realm, where it would remain until her great-great-grandson Ptolemy Apion left it to the Roman Republic in his will in 96 BCE.

==== Ruler cult ====
In 244 or 243 BCE, Berenice and her husband were incorporated into the Ptolemaic state cults and worshipped as the Theoi Euergetai (Benefactor Gods), alongside Alexander the Great and the earlier Ptolemies. Berenice was also worshipped as a goddess on her own, Thea Euergetis (Benefactor Goddess). She was often equated with Aphrodite and Isis and came to be particularly associated with protection against shipwrecks. Most of the evidence for this cult derives from the reign of Ptolemy IV or later, but a cult in her honour is attested in the Fayyum in Ptolemy III's reign. This cult closely parallels that offered to her mother-in-law, Arsinoe II, who was also equated with Aphrodite and Isis, and associated with protection from shipwrecks. The parallelism is also presented on the gold coinage minted posthumously in honour of the two queens. The coinage of Arsinoe II bears a pair of cornucopiae on the reverse side, while that of Berenice bears a single cornucopia.

Berenice was also granted the title of vizier, highlighting her position as king's advisor.

==== Berenice's Lock ====
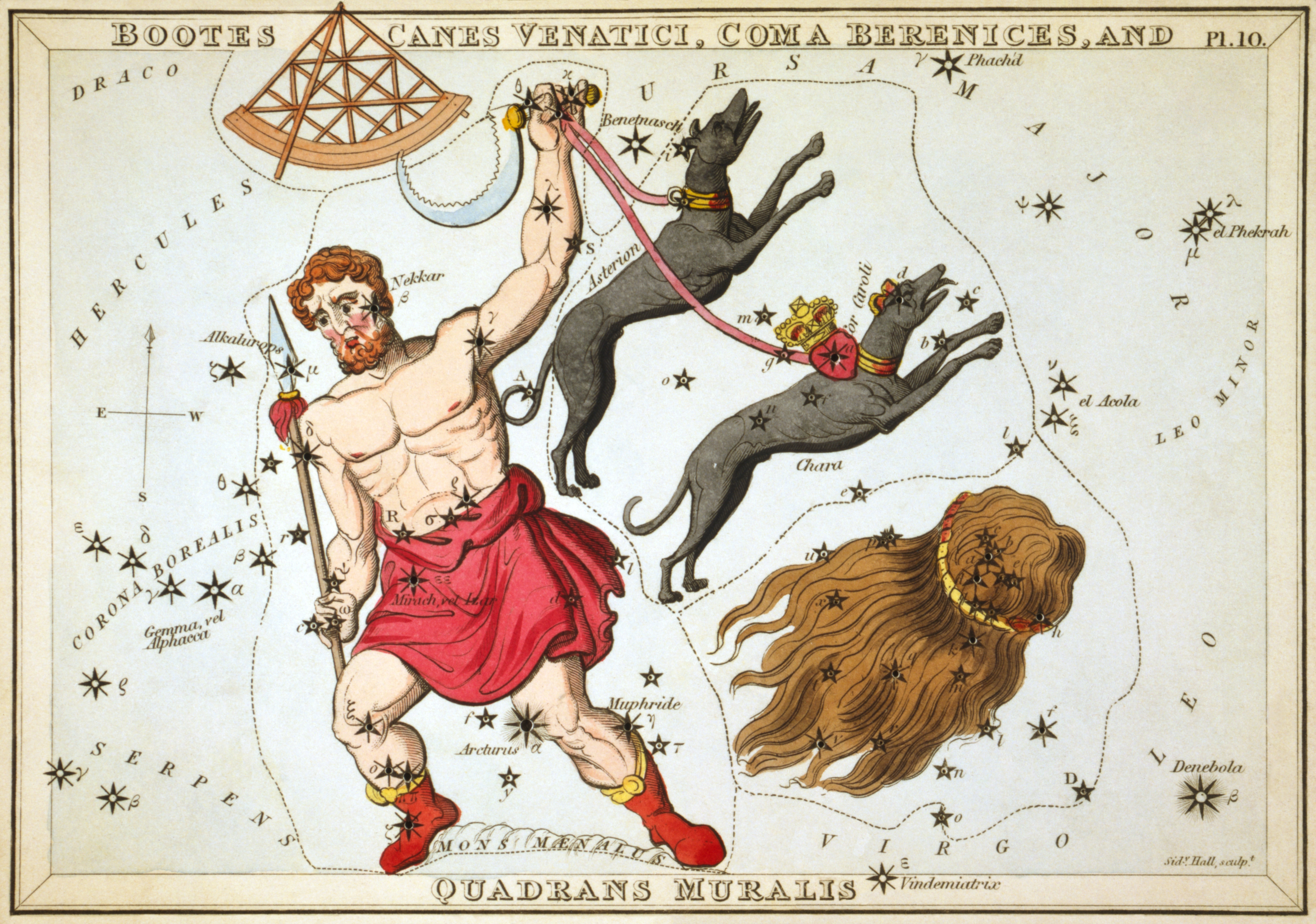
Coma Berenices constellation noted

Berenice's divinity is closely connected with the story of "Berenice's Lock". According to this story, Berenice vowed to sacrifice her long hair as a votive offering if Ptolemy III returned safely from battle during the Third Syrian War. She dedicated her tresses to and placed them in the temple at Cape Zephyrium in Alexandria, where Arsinoe II was worshipped as Aphrodite, but the next morning the tresses had disappeared. Conon of Samos, the court astronomer identified a constellation as the missing hair, claiming that Aphrodite had placed it in the sky as an acknowledgement of Berenice's sacrifice. The constellation is known to this day as Coma Berenices (Latin for 'Berenice's Lock'). It is unclear whether this event took place before or after Ptolemy's return; Branko van Oppen de Ruiter suggests that it happened after Ptolemy's return (around March–June or May 245 BCE). This episode served to link Berenice with the goddess Isis in her role as goddess of rebirth, since she was meant to have dedicated a lock of her own hair at Koptos in mourning for her husband Osiris.

The story was widely propagated by the Ptolemaic court. Seals were produced depicting Berenice with a shaved head and the attributes of Isis/Demeter. The poet Callimachus, who was based in the Ptolemaic court, celebrated the event in a poem, The Lock of Berenice, of which only a few lines remain. The first century BCE Roman poet Catullus produced a loose translation or adaptation of the poem in Latin, and a prose summary appears in Hyginus' De astronomia. The story was popular in the early modern period when it was illustrated by many neoclassical painters.

==== Panhellenic Games ====
Berenice entered a chariot team in the Nemean Games of 243 or 241 BCE and was victorious. The success is celebrated in another poem by Callimachus' Victory of Berenice. This poem connects Berenice with Io, a lover of Zeus in Greek mythology, who was also connected with Isis by contemporary Greeks. When she won in the four-horse chariot race at the Olympics in the early third century BCE, she commissioned an epigram by the poet Posidippus in which she explicitly claimed to have "stolen" the fame (κῦδος) of Cynisca. Her epigram was included in the so-called Greek Anthology, which also indicates its continuing relevance long after the victory itself.

==== Death ====
Ptolemy III died in late 222 BCE and was succeeded by his son by Berenice, Ptolemy IV Philopator. Berenice died soon after, in early 221 BCE. Polybius states that she was poisoned, as part of a general purge of the royal family by the new king's regent Sosibius. She continued to be venerated in the state ruler cult. By 211 BCE, she had her own priestess, the athlophorus ('prize-bearer'), who marched in processions in Alexandria behind the priest of Alexander the Great and the Ptolemies, and the canephorus of the deified Arsinoe II.

== Legacy ==
The city of Euesperides (now the Libyan city of Benghazi) was renamed Berenice in her honour, a name it retained until the Middle Ages.

The asteroid 653 Berenike, discovered in 1907, also is named after Queen Berenice.

== Issue ==
With Ptolemy III she had the following children:

Name	Image	Birth	Death	Notes
Arsinoe III		246/5 BCE	204 BCE	Married her brother Ptolemy IV in 220 BCE.
Ptolemy IV Philopator		May/June 244 BCE	July/August 204 BCE	King of Egypt from 222 - 204 BCE.
A son		July/August 243 BCE	Perhaps 221 BCE	Name unknown, possibly 'Lysimachus'. He was probably killed in or before the political purge of 221 BCE.
Alexander		September/October 242 BCE	Perhaps 221 BCE	He was probably killed in or before the political purge of 221 BCE.
Magas		November/December 241 BCE	221 BCE	Scalded to death in his bath by Theogos or Theodotus, at the orders of Ptolemy IV.
Berenice		January/February 239 BCE	February/March 238 BCE	Posthumously deified on 7 March 238 BCE by the Canopus Decree, as Berenice Anasse Parthenon (Berenice, mistress of virgins).

== Bibliography ==
- Clayman, Dee L. (2014). Berenice II and the golden age of Ptolemaic Egypt. Oxford University Press. ISBN 9780195370881.
- Hölbl, Günther (2001). A History of the Ptolemaic Empire. London & New York: Routledge. pp. 143–152 & 181–194. ISBN 0415201454.
- van Oppen de Ruiter, Branko (2016). Berenice II Euergetis: Essays in Early Hellenistic Queenship. Palgrave Macmillan, a division of Nature America, Inc. ISBN 9781137494627.
