= Antigonus, son of Echecrates =

Antigonus (Ancient Greek: Ἀντίγονος), son of Echecrates, named after his uncle Antigonus III Doson. He revealed to Philip V of Macedon a few months before his death in 179 BCE, the false accusations of his son Perseus of Macedon against his other son Demetrius, in consequence of which Philip put the latter to death. Indignant at the conduct of Perseus, Philip appointed Antigonus his successor; but on his death, Perseus obtained possession of the throne, and had Antigonus killed.
