= Antigonia =

Antigonia may refer to:

== Places ==
- Antigonia (Chaonia), near Saraqinisht, southern Albania
  - Archaeological National park of Antigonea
- Antigonia (Paeonia), in Paeonia, Macedon
- Antigonia Psaphara, in Crucis, Chalcidice, Greece
- Antigoneia (Syria), in Syria, now near Antakya, Hatay Province, Turkey
- Alexandria Troas or Antigonia, in Troas, Asia Minor, now Eski Stambul, Çanakkale Province, Turkey
- Diocese of Antigonia, a former see in the Roman province Hellespontus
- Nicaea or Antigonia, Bithynia, now İznik, Bursa Province, Turkey
- Mantinea or Antigonia, Arcadia, Greece

== Other uses ==
- Antigonia (fish), a genus of fish
