= Antigone of Macedon =

Macedonian noblewoman

Antigone (Greek: Ἀντιγόνη) was a Macedonian noblewoman who lived in the 4th century BC.

She was born to Cassander by a mother whose name is unknown. Antigone was the niece of the Regent Antipater. Her father and paternal uncle were the sons of Iolaus and through her father Antigone was a distant collateral relative to the Argead dynasty.

Antigone was originally from either Paliura or Eordaea. Little is known of her life. Antigone married a Macedonian nobleman of obscure origin called Magas who was from Eordaea. Antigone and Magas lived in Eordaea and had a daughter called Berenice I of Egypt.

== Sources ==
- Berenice I article at Livius.org
- Ptolemaic Genealogy: Berenice I
- Ptolemaic Dynasty - Affiliated Lines: Antipatrids
- W. Heckel, Who's who in the age of Alexander the Great: prosopography of Alexander's empire, Wiley-Blackwell, 2006
