= Cassander (brother of Antipater) =

Ancient Macedonian noble, brother of Antipater

Cassander (Greek: Κάσσανδρος) was a Macedonian nobleman who lived in the 4th century BC.

Cassander was the son of Iolaus by a mother whose name is unknown, and was the brother of the powerful Regent and general Antipater. Cassander’s family were distant collateral relatives to the Argead dynasty. Cassander, like Antipater, was originally from the Macedonian city of Paliura and was a contemporary to Aristotle.

Little is known on his life. He married a Greek Macedonian noblewoman whose name is unknown, and they had a child: a daughter called Antigone who married a Greek Macedonian nobleman called Magas by whom she had a daughter called Berenice I of Egypt. His namesake was his nephew Cassander, who became king of Macedon.

== Sources ==
- H.J. Rose, A new general biographical dictionary, Volume 2, T. Fellowes, 1857
- W. Heckel, Who’s who in the age of Alexander the Great: prosopography of Alexander’s empire, Wiley-Blackwell, 2006
- Ptolemaic Dynasty - Affiliated Lines: Antipatrids
- Ptolemaic Genealogy: Berenice I
