= Rosemarie and Dietrich Klemm Collection =

Archive of Egyptian quarry rocks at the British Museum

The Rosemarie and Dietrich Klemm Collection, deposited in the British Museum in London, consists of thousands of rock samples from the sites of Egyptian quarries. The collection was formed by the Egyptologist Rosemarie Klemm and the geologist Dietrich D. Klemm, both at LMU Munich. Comparison with these rock samples can make it possible to identify, certainly or with probability, the origin of the stone used in ancient Egyptian architecture, statues and inscriptions.

Before its deposit in the Museum the collection was consulted in 1999 during conservation of the Rosetta Stone. The study showed a close resemblance to rock from a small granodiorite quarry at Gebel Tingar on the west bank of the Nile, west of Elephantine in the region of Aswan; the pink vein running across the upper part of the Rosetta Stone was also noted as typical of granodiorite from this region.

== Bibliography ==
- Klemm, Rosemarie and Klemm, Dietrich. Stone and Stone Quarries in Ancient Egypt. London: British Museum Publications, 2008. ISBN 978-0-7141-2326-4
