= Cultural property imaging =

Imaging of cultural works

Cultural property imaging is a necessary part of long term preservation of cultural heritage. While the physical conditions of objects will change over time, imaging serves as a way to document and represent heritage in a moment in time of the life of the item. Different methods of imaging produce results that are applicable in various circumstances. Not every method is appropriate for every object, and not every object needs to be imaged by multiple methods. In addition to preservation and conservation-related concerns, imaging can also serve to enhance research and study of cultural heritage.

== Purpose ==
One reason for imaging objects is to make the items available for study and scholarship without incurring unnecessary harm to the object. In addition to providing images to scholars, images can also be added to online catalogs and databases to increase the size of the audience interacting with the objects and allow them to view the item with no added risk.

Another reason is for documentary purposes, especially as it relates to conservation. According to the American Institute for Conservation, "Documentation is basic to the ethical practice of conservation." Imaging prior to conservation allows conservators to record the current state of the object, which can then be compared to later images following conservation. This allows someone in the future to look back and see the ways in which an item was impacted by conservation. Images taken over different periods of time can also reveal changes in condition and can be used to minimize damage going forward. The American Institute for Conservation's Guide to Digital Photography and Conservation Documentation is a useful reference guide for the application of digital imaging to the field of conservation. It details guidelines for equipment, techniques, and practices that are in line with best practices for conservation. This covers everything from suggestions for types of cameras and memory cards to discussing processing details and how to apply metadata.

An additional purpose is found in the way imaging enhances scholarship. Different types of imaging can reveal materials and techniques used in creating an object that are not immediately evident with the naked eye.

== Methods ==
There are many methods that are employed in imaging. These may include different types of lighting as well as the use of radiography. Multiple energy levels and technologies have been used for cultural heritage imaging, including imaging mummy masks with multiple spectral bands of light, different x-ray technologies, optical coherence tomography, and terahertz imaging. Photographing objects under standard conditions is a typical practice to preserve the item in perpetuity, but not every object will need more specialized imaging. Those doing the imaging or requesting the imaging be done will look at each object on a case-by-case basis to determine the usefulness of specialized imaging. In some cases combinations of different types of imaging will be more effective than one type on its own. This can be seen in projects like the Getty's conservation of Guercino's Jacob Blessing the Sons of Joseph and the Getty's APPEAR project, details of which can be found on a blog by the Penn Museum's Artifact Lab.

=== Photography ===
Photography under normal illumination will produce a record of the appearance of an object in standard conditions. Standard conditions typically mean uniform illumination with minimal glare. In conservation, these images will serve as a "before treatment" record. They can also serve as a catalog image for in-house use or an online collection. Following a standard image capture, subsequent images can be taken under various conditions to highlight areas that need treatment or closer monitoring.

==== Raking illumination ====
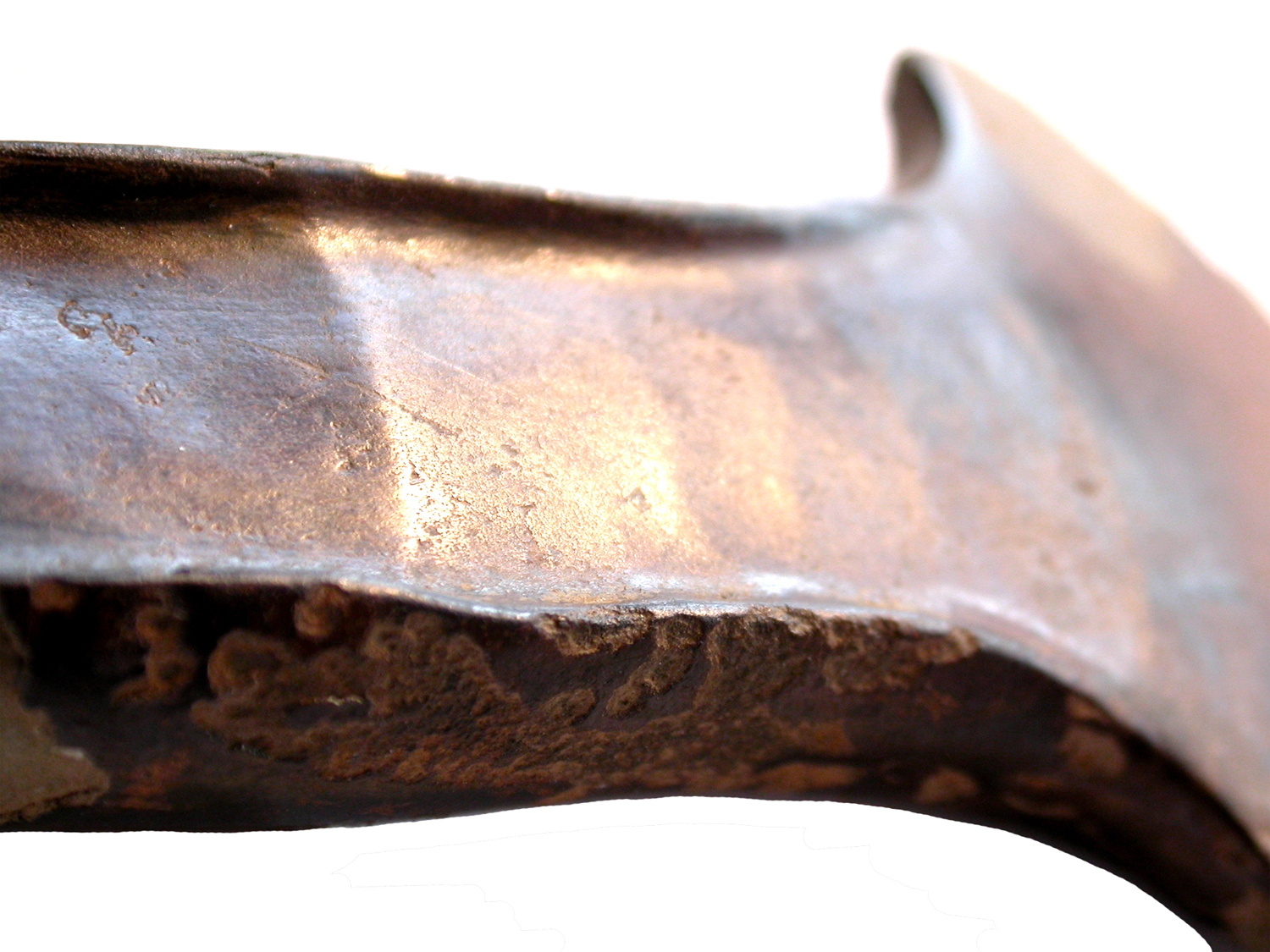
Raking light allows the viewer to see hammering scars that are not evident in standard lighting conditions.

Raking illumination highlights texture on the surface of an object. This is achieved by using a single light source at a low angle relative to the object. Images taken under these conditions can reveal deviations in the surface of an object – gouges, scratches, paint loss, bulges, and more. With archaeological objects this may reveal how tools were made or how food was processed (e.g. cut marks on bones). In paintings it can show how the artist used the paint.

==== Specular illumination ====
Specular illumination documents the surface sheen of an object. With paintings, it is used to highlight areas of abnormality. While raking illumination will produce a record of these abnormalities with greater clarity, specular illumination is less dependent on the orientation of the light. There are two basic setups for specular illumination – axial and oblique. An axial setup requires the camera and the light source to be on the same axis. The camera is parallel to the surface of the object, and the light source is next to the camera. An oblique setup requires the camera and the light source to be on opposite sides of the subject, but each are at the same angle relative to the object. Specular light can allow conservators to see tool marks on wooden objects, or indentations that seemed invisible.

==== Transmitted illumination ====
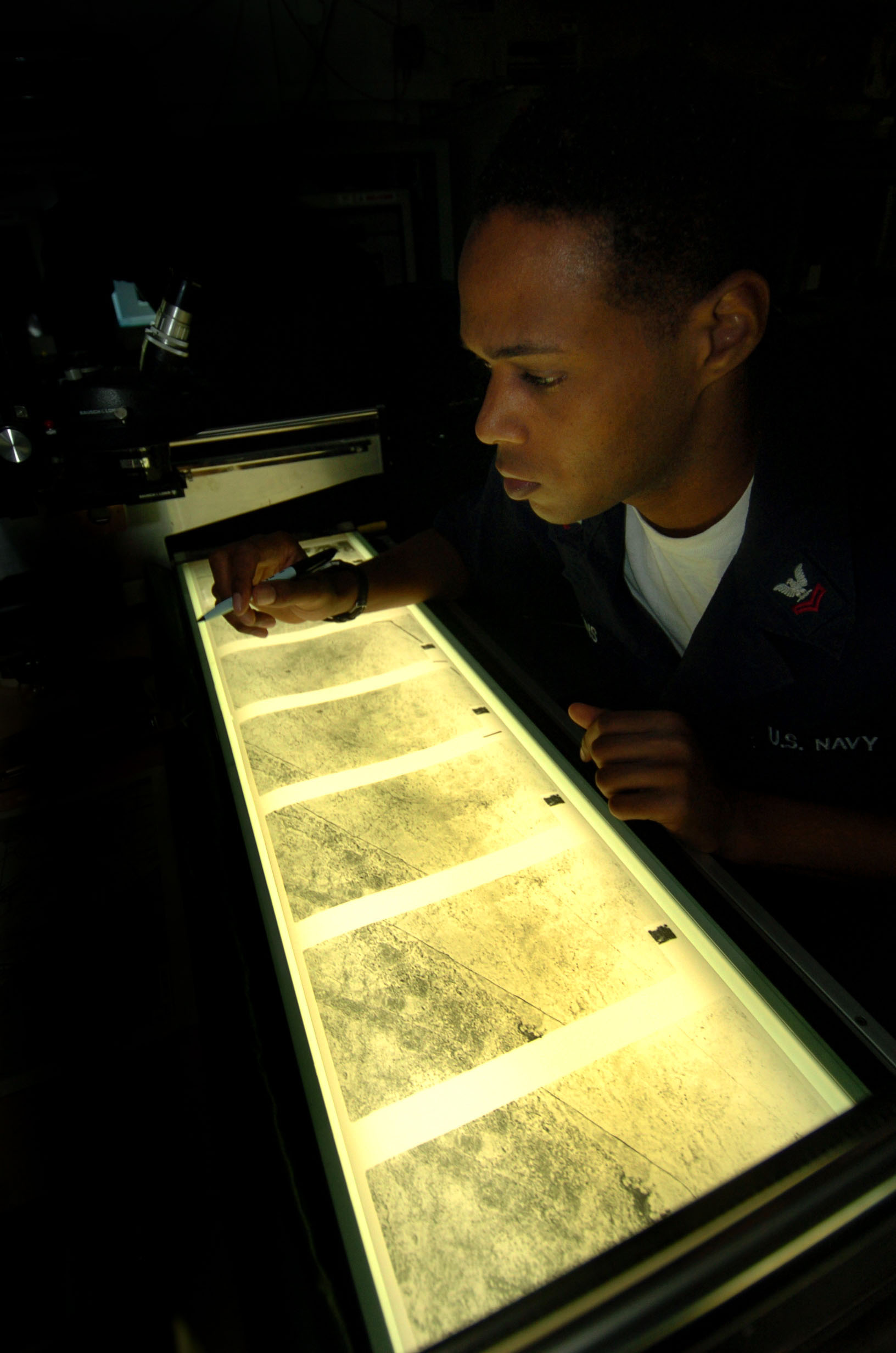
Transmitted illumination is similar to the effects of a light table or lightbox on a two-dimensional object.

Transmitted illumination is used to highlight thickness and losses among other things. Transmitted illumination uses a light source that is behind the object being photographed. (For two-dimensional objects this has a very similar function to a light table.) This back lighting provides a way to see things like cracks and holes as well as revealing the general structure of an item. With something like papyrus, it can help to reveal the condition of the individual fibers. It can also be useful with textiles or basketry items where a tight weave may make it difficult to see damage or clues about how the item was woven.

=== Infrared Photography ===

Infrared photography has been used in conservation since the 1930s. In art the most well-known application is being able to see underdrawings of paintings or changes in composition. Picasso's the Blue Room is a famous example of this. It has also been used to enhance legibility of manuscripts and inscriptions, as seen with the Dead Sea Scrolls and the International Dunhuang Project. Carbon black ink tends to show up very well under infrared.

=== Ultraviolet Photography ===
Ultraviolet photography is frequently used for differentiation and characterization of materials. Ultraviolet radiation can cause materials to emit fluorescence that can be seen and photographed. The intensity and color of the fluorescence is influenced by the amount of material, the types of materials, and the amount of deterioration.

UV radiation can also reveal things not visible to the naked eye. Codex Sinaiticus contains the oldest, complete copy of the New Testament. On the last page of the Gospel of John UV radiation shows that the final sentence was added later. While the implications for this are rooted in biblical scholarship, this shows that there is more to manuscripts than what is found at the surface level. In conservation this shows that with UV radiation even the "invisible" becomes part of the record for the object and must be documented and monitored.

With paintings, UV can reveal where prior restorations have occurred. The varnish on top of a painting is usually more fluorescent than the pigments. If there is paint on top of a varnish, the conservator knows that there has been some restoration in the past. UV can also help to reveal materials used in a painting.

=== Multi-Spectral Imaging (MSI) ===
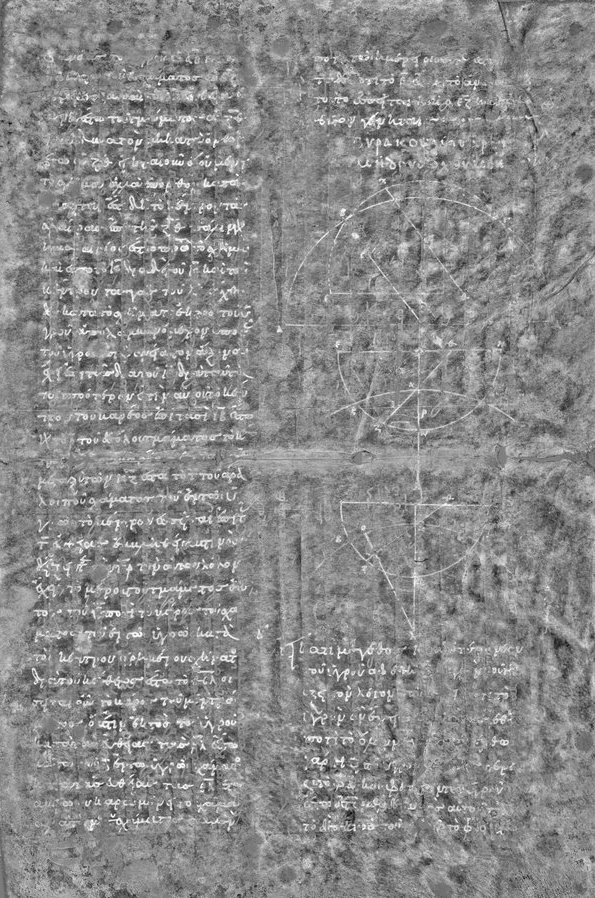
The original text of the Archimedes Palimpsest can be seen after imaging.

A Multispectral image is an image with capture points across the light spectrum. Different wavelengths of light are separated by filters or illuminated with narrow bands of light. These filters can also be combined with different colors of light as well as IR and UV to produce different results and fluorescence. MSI has been used in several major projects regarding ancient manuscripts. Not only is this useful for making these texts legible and available, but these images are useful for conservation. By recording things that are not easily seen, MSI helps conservators to be aware of what they couldn't see and allows them to monitor these conditions. This can be seen in examples of paintings like the Mummy Portraits. The Penn Museum has shown through MSI that one of their portraits has an outline of the figure etched in the paint. This is something that was not visible under standard conditions, and something they didn't notice on other portraits.

MSI also helps scholars to be able to read previously illegible texts. The Archimedes Palimpsest (further discussed below) is a famous example of this, but many other palimpsests have been rendered legible by this process. Multiple groups, institutions and companies work to image manuscripts using MSI and other methods to digitally preserve them, make them accessible to scholars, and improve legibility.

Historic Structures are also being studied with MSI, as demonstrated with the study of a Civil War era house in the City of Fairfax, Virginia, with a narrowband multispectral imaging system to support research into soldiers' graffiti and preservation of the interior wall structure.

=== Optical coherence tomography ===
Optical coherence tomography (OCT) can help reveal layers and 3D visualizations of text in various media, including papyrus and paper. It has been used with multispectral imaging to provide more information about text and ink on different layers of an object. This has been used in research into papyrus mummy mask cartonnage to image small areas of cartonnage in conjunction with narrowband multispectral imaging to reveal ink layers.

=== Reflectance Transformation Imaging (RTI) ===
Reflectance Transformation Imaging uses special procedures to create a polynomial texture map of an object. These PTMs are created from a set of images using a stationary camera and a single source of light that can be held in different positions.

The following is quoted from Cultural Heritage Imaging's website:

"RTI images are created from information derived from multiple digital photographs of a subject shot from a stationary camera position. In each photograph, light is projected from a different known, or knowable, direction. This process produces a series of images of the same subject with varying highlights and shadows. Lighting information from the images is mathematically synthesized to generate a mathematical model of the surface, enabling a user to re-light the RTI image interactively and examine its surface on a screen.

Each RTI resembles a single, two-dimensional (2D) photographic image. Unlike a typical photograph, reflectance information is derived from the three-dimensional (3D) shape of the image subject and encoded in the image per pixel, so that the synthesized RTI image "knows" how light will reflect off the subject. When the RTI is opened in RTI viewing software, each constituent pixel is able to reflect the software's interactive "virtual" light from any position selected by the user. This changing interplay of light and shadow in the image discloses fine details of the subject's 3D surface form.

RTI was invented by Tom Malzbender and Dan Gelb, research scientists at Hewlett-Packard Labs. A landmark paper describing these first tools and methods, named Polynomial Texture Mapping (PTM), was published in 2001."

RTI has several applications for cultural heritage. In many instances PTMs can improve the legibility of inscriptions, such as metal amulets whose inscriptions have been obscured by corrosion. PTMs have also been found to be useful in analyzing ceramics and paintings. Cracks and pitting that were not visible under standard conditions became visible using RTI. The Tate and the National Gallery investigated the use of PTMs and determined that they could be viable alternatives to raking light; especially since PTMs were found to be more easily replicated than raking light photographs.

With manuscripts RTI can highlight the shape and structure of pages. While these pages are typically viewed as two-dimensional items, RTI makes them three-dimensional and shows that there is more than just a flat page. This is helpful for legibility (for scholars) and for condition (for conservators). Scholars can see the text more clearly and may even be able to see text that was erased. This is especially true in conditions where the ink "ate" letter-shaped holes into the page surface. Conservators can use the PTMs to determine the degree of damage to the surface, as cracks, buckling, and holes become much more pronounced.

For examples of the types of results RTI can produce see the videos on Cultural Heritage Imaging's Website http://culturalheritageimaging.org/Technologies/RTI/

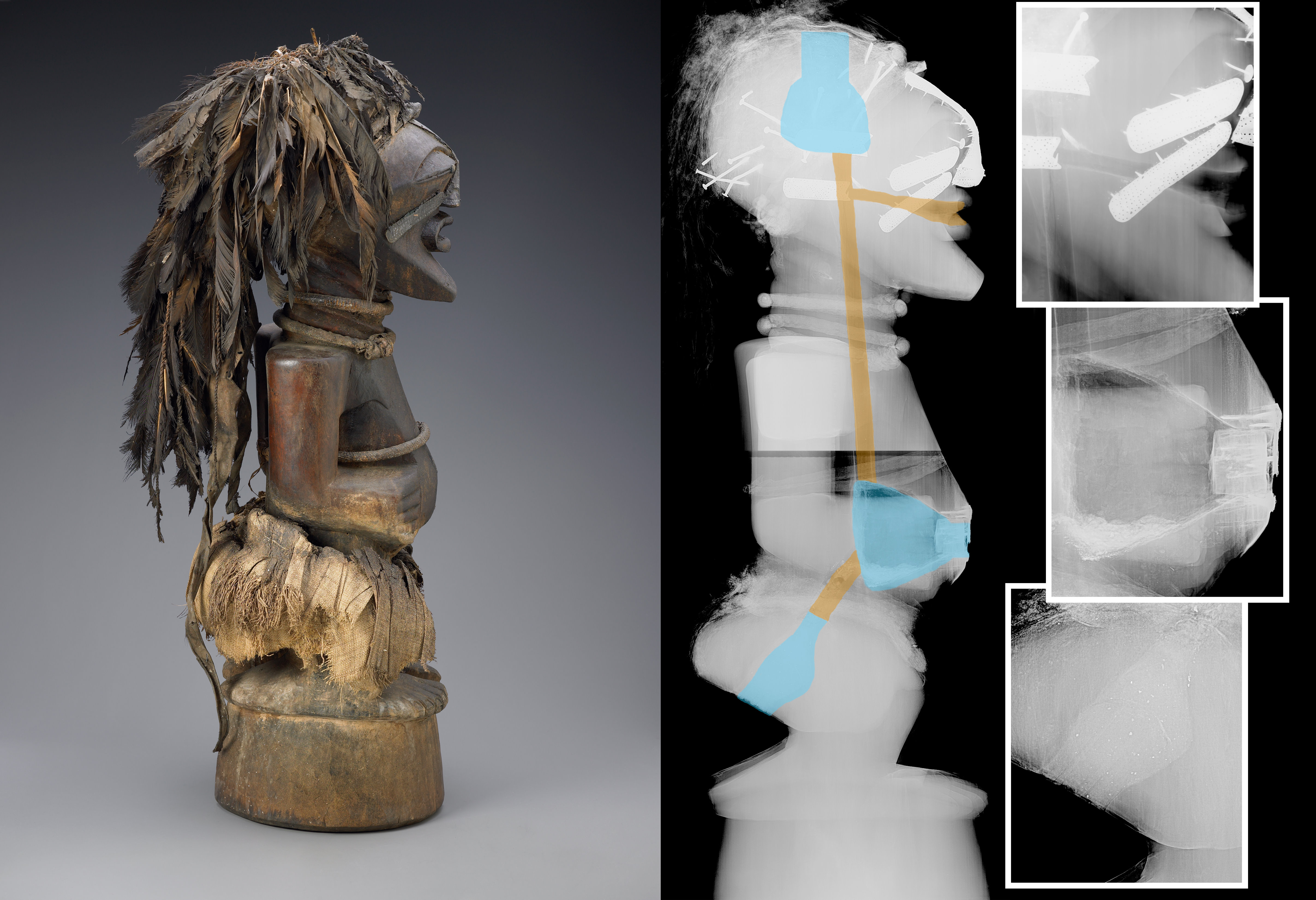
Radiographic image of an African Songye Power Figure that shows some of the internal structure of the item. (Indianapolis Museum of Art)

=== Radiography ===
Radiography is a non-destructive analysis of the internal structure of an object, that uses x-rays to create an image. For paintings this means that conservators can potentially see the inner structure of the painting and learn about the materials and techniques used by the original artist. Radiography can also be used on archaeological objects or sculptures to learn more about the internal structure of the items that would otherwise be invisible without destroying the object. This type of imaging produces a two-dimensional image of the inner workings of the item. X-ray technology has been used to read the damaged Herculaneum Papyri as opposed to trying to unroll the scroll to read its contents. As part of a conservation measure on the Ghent Altarpiece x-rays were created to better understand how the piece was painted and put together. Images from that project can be viewed on the Closer to Van Eyck website. On the Penn Museum's Artifact Lab blog, there are multiple entries discussing the applications of radiography on cultural heritage.

CT scans create a three-dimensional image from many 2-D radiographic images. This produces cross sections of images and allows for the isolation of layers. Like the 2-D images, this allows for a look at the inner sections of objects without causing damage. CT scans have been used on mummies (more similar to traditional medical uses of CT scans) as well as other objects, like cuneiform tablets. CT scans have also been used on papyrus scrolls to digitally unroll them—allowing for them to be read, but not causing any harm. The Natural History Museum in London has used CT scans to take images of some of their specimens and create 3D models. This is a much less invasive technique than the traditional model of molding and casting. All of these applications have the goal of being as noninvasive as possible while still trying to gather as much information as possible.

Magnetic resonance imaging is a technique used in radiology that does not use x-rays. It is mainly used in medical imaging to generate images of the organs of the body. It can also be applied to deceased individuals. For example, a female burial from Novosibirsk, Russia was found to have suffered from breast cancer. This type of imaging allows for a noninvasive analysis of past individuals to help scientists better understand past human ancestors.

== Examples ==
There are hundreds and possibly thousands of examples of projects that use noninvasive imaging techniques. Highlighted here are several that are more commonly known.

=== Archimedes Palimpsest ===
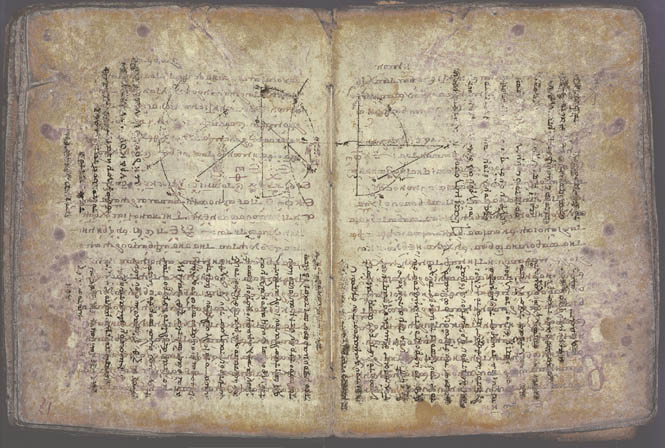
Archimedes Palimpsest

The Archimedes Palimpsest is a parchment manuscript that contains writings from two different time periods. In the 13th century monks erased and wrote over a 10th-century copy of some works originally written by Archimedes. Through a combination of different imaging techniques (MSI, raking illumination and X-ray fluorescence) and various processing procedures the older layer became legible.

=== Syriac Galen Palimpsest ===
The Syriac Galen Palimpsest is a parchment manuscript with an early translation of the Greek medical philosopher Galen of Pergamon overwritten with psalms for days of the week. MSI and later x-ray fluorescence were used to reveal the undertext of Galen.

=== Egyptian mummies ===
With the use of imaging technologies, research can be conducted on mummies without having to unwrap them. A 2014 exhibition at the British Museum highlighted these imaging techniques in conjunction with the eight mummies that were imaged. The CT scans produced allow for a digital layer by layer look at the burials. Mummy masks have been studied with six different imaging technologies in a global project involving multiple institutions to demonstrate the feasibility of using non-destructive digital imaging technology to make texts visible in images of papyrus.

=== Cuneiform tablets and envelopes ===
CT scanners have been used to look at cuneiform tablets layer by layer in order to reproduce them with a 3D printer. This has been done at Cornell University and at TU Delft ("Scanning for Syria") where scans were done of silicon molds rather than original tablets. In a presentation titled, "Using CT to Image and 3D print Cuneiform Tablets without Removing Them from Their Envelopes," at the ASOR annual meeting in 2016 Dr. Andrew Shortland discussed how his team had figured out a way to isolate the inner tablet from the envelope and read what was on it without breaking the outer, envelope layer.

=== En-Gedi Scroll ===
Rendered unreadable after a fire in 600 CE, the En-Gedi Scroll is the earliest copy of a Pentateuchal book ever found in a Holy Ark. This scroll cannot be touched without inflicting further damage, making noninvasive imaging an ideal technique for revealing the text inside. Using micro-CT scanning, which creates a 3D rendering of the scroll where brightness corresponds to density, conservators were able to distinguish the dense metallic ink from the carbon-based scroll. Using virtual unwrapping techniques, computer scientists were able to convert the 3D position-density information provided by the scan into a 2D visualization of the 'unwrapped' scroll.
