= Rashid National Museum =

Museum in Rashid, Egypt

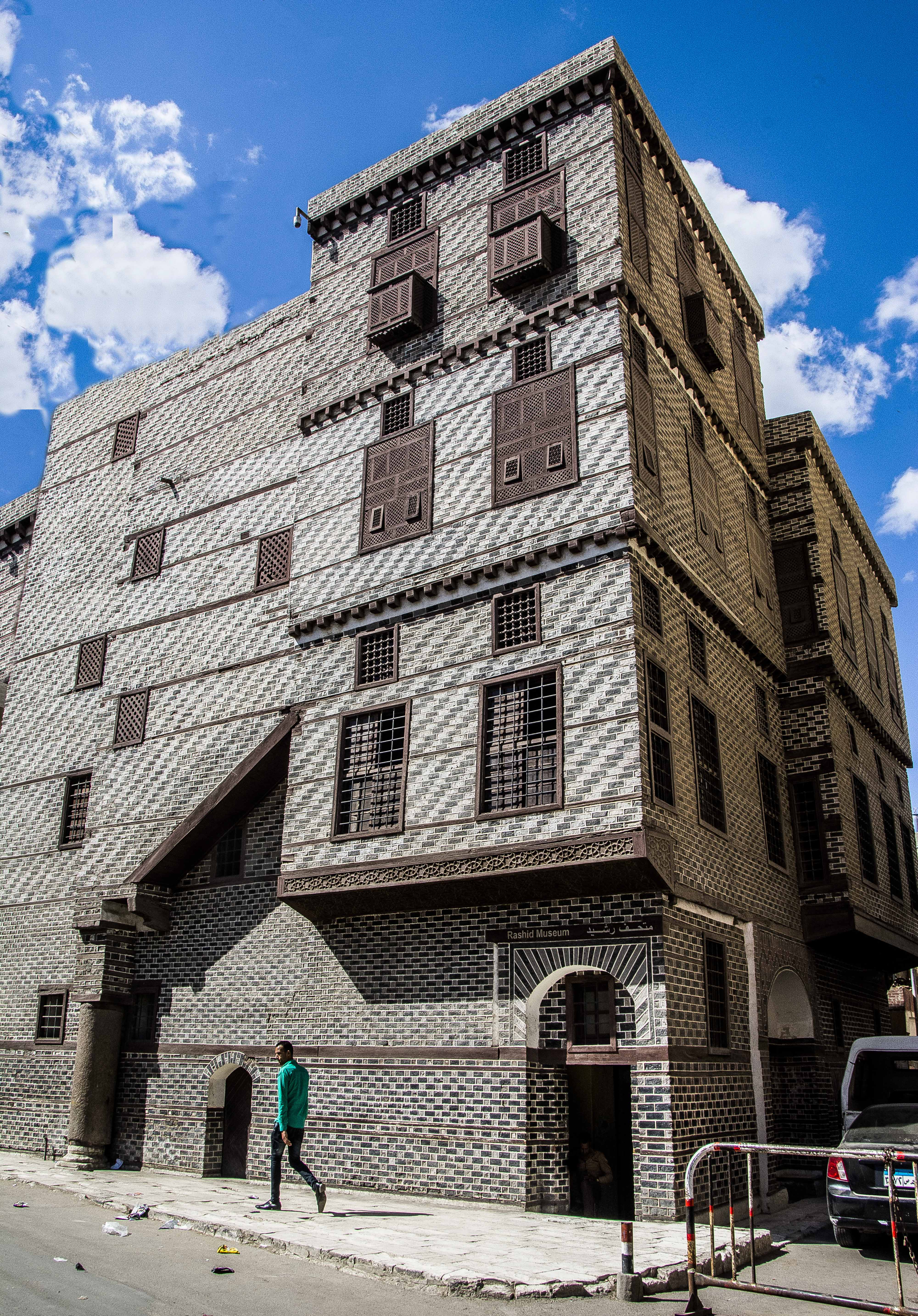
- Established: September 19, 1959
- Location: Rashid, Egypt
- Coordinates: 31.4050°N 30.4244°E

The Rashid National Museum is an Egyptian history museum located in Rashid, on the west bank of the Nile River. The museum is housed in a three-story townhouse known as the "Arab Killy house", which is famous for its architecture. The house was originally the home of Arab Gali Hussein Bey, a governor of the city during the Ottoman era.

The museum contains artifacts and models that highlight the struggle of the people of Rashid and the battles they fought against the French and English colonizers. It includes pictures of battles, family life, handicrafts, folklore, manuscripts, and tools for daily life, in addition to a copy of the Rosetta Stone, which was discovered in Rashid (also known as Rosetta) in 1799, and a collection of weapons from the 18th and 19th centuries. The museum also displays some Islamic artifacts that were discovered in Rashid, such as Islamic coins and pottery.

President Gamal Abdel Nasser inaugurated the Rasheed Museum as a military museum on September 19, 1959, during his visit to the city. In 1986, the museum was developed and reopened to reflect the history of the city of Rashid.

== Gallery ==
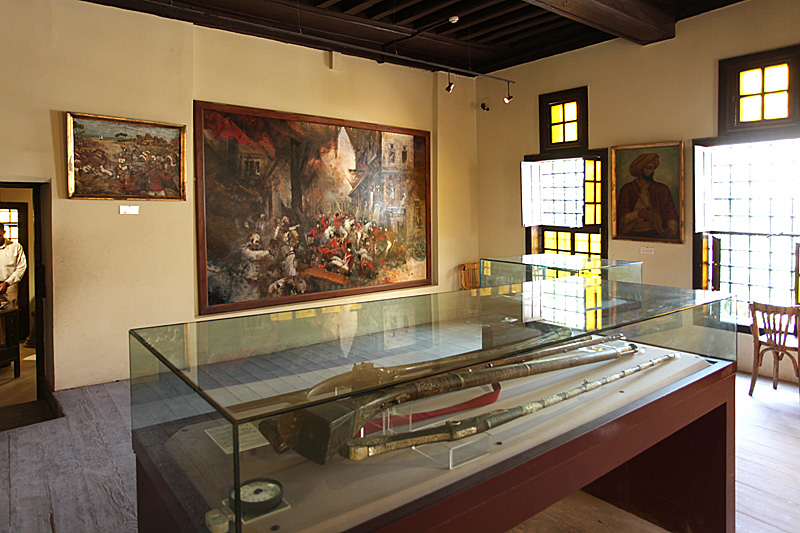
Museum collections

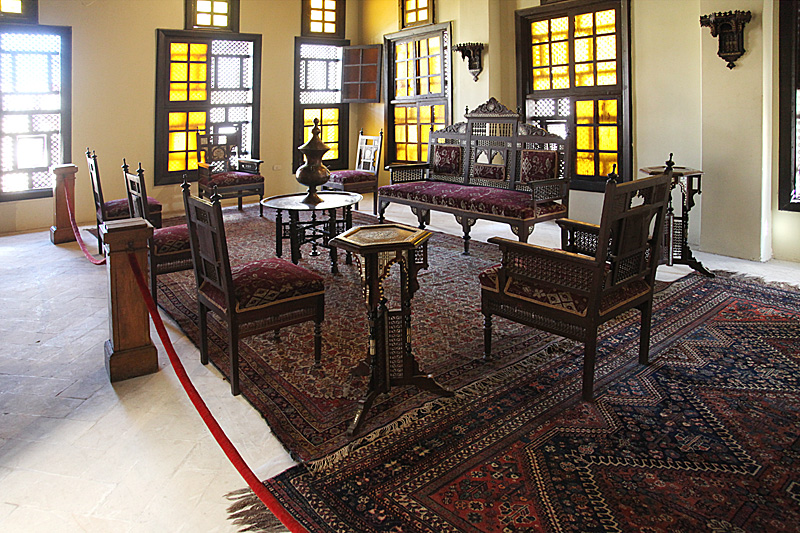
Inside the museum

== See also ==
- Media related to Arab Killy house at Wikimedia Commons
