= Hubert-Pascal Ameilhon =

French historian and librarian (1730–1811)

Hubert-Pascal Ameilhon (born in Paris, 7 April 1730; died 1811) was a French historian and librarian.

He first worked at the Bibliothèque historique de la ville de Paris, the city of Paris historical library. In 1766 he published a history of trade and seafaring in Ptolemaic Egypt, a work that was commended by the Académie des Inscriptions et Belles-Lettres; he became a member of the academy in 1766. He completed the multi-volume Histoire du Bas-Empire, a history of the Later Roman Empire and early medieval Europe, left unfinished by Charles Le Beau. Taking up the work of Gabriel de La Porte du Theil he produced the first published translation (into Latin and French) of the Greek inscription on the Rosetta Stone: this was published in 1803.

He was responsible for saving up to 800,000 printed books threatened with destruction in the early years of the French Revolution. Many of these found a home at the Bibliothèque de l'Arsenal, of which he became director in 1800 (perpetual administrator in 1804).

== Major works ==
- Histoire du commerce et de la navigation des Égyptiens, sous le Règne des Ptolémées (1766).
- Histoire du Bas-Empire en commençant à Constantin le Grand par Charles Le Beau (vols 22–29, 1781–1817).
- Éclaircissements sur l'inscription grecque du monument trouvé à Rosette (1803).

== Bibliography ==
- Hélène Dufresne, Érudition et esprit public au XVIIIe siècle: le bibliothécaire Hubert-Pascal Ameilhon (1730-1811). Paris: Nizet, 1962
