= Charles le Beau =

French historical writer

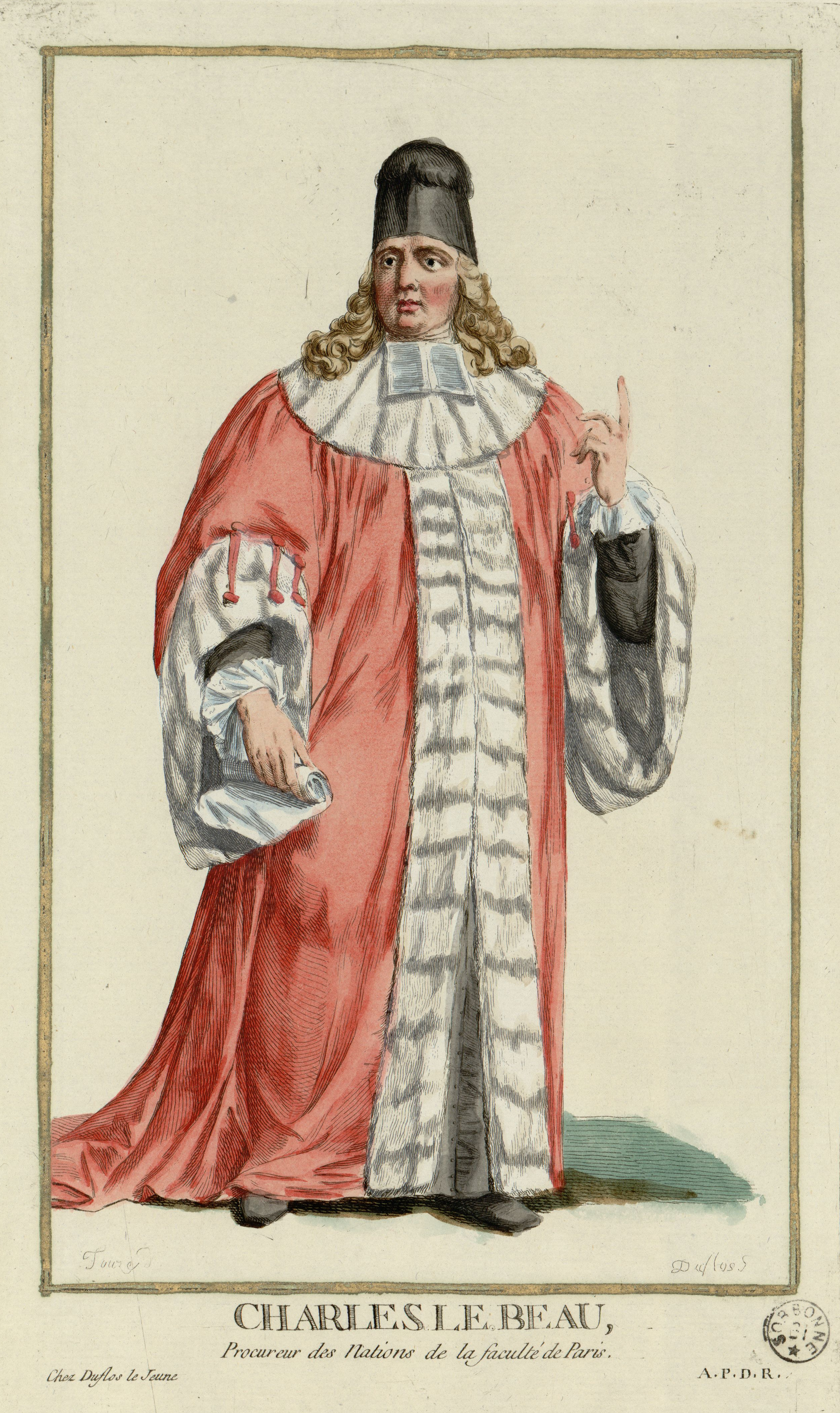
Charles Le Beau, Regent of the Faculty of Arts at the University of Paris (Bibliothèque de la Sorbonne, NuBIS)

Charles le Beau (18 October 1701, Paris – 13 March 1778, Paris) was a French historical writer.

He was born in Paris, and was educated at the Collège de Sainte-Barbe and the Collège du Plessis; at the latter he remained as a teacher until he obtained the chair of rhetoric in the Collège des Grassins. In 1748 he was admitted as a member of the Academy of Inscriptions, and in 1752 he was nominated professor of Latin eloquence at the Collège de France. From 1755 onward, he held the office of perpetual secretary to the Academy of Inscriptions, in which capacity he edited fifteen volumes (from the 25th to the 39th inclusive) of the Histoire of that institution.

He is best remembered as the author of Histoire du Bas-Empire, en commençant à Constantin le Grand, in 22 volumes (Paris, 1756–1779). This is a continuation of Charles Rollin's Histoire Romaine and JBL Crevier's Histoire des empereurs. Its usefulness arises entirely from the fact of its being a faithful resume of the Byzantine historians. Five volumes were added by H.-P. Ameilhon (1781–1811), which brought the work down to the fall of Constantinople. A later edition was produced by Antoine-Jean Saint-Martin and afterwards of Marie-Félicité Brosset.

== List of works ==
- Histoire de l'Académie royale des inscriptions et belles-lettres, avec les mémoires de littérature, Tome XXV à XXXIX, 1759-1777.
- Histoire du Bas-Empire en commençant à Constantin le Grand, 27 volumes, 1757-1811 (five volumes being added by Hubert-Pascal Ameilhon).
- Opera latina : Carmina, Fabulae et narrationes, Orationes et oratiunculae, 3 volumes, 1782-1783.
- Parallèle curieux des fables en vers latins de M. Lebeau avec La Fontaine, et tous les poètes latins qui ont traité les mêmes fables, 1785 (with Jean de La Fontaine).
