= Gabriel de La Porte du Theil =

Francois-Jean-Gabriel de La Porte du Theil (16 July 1742 in Paris – 28 May 1815) was a French historian. He played a role in the early attempts to decipher the Rosetta Stone.

His translation of Orestes by Aeschylus was published in 1770 and was admitted to the Académie des Inscriptions et Belles-Lettres the same year.

Two of the lithographic copies made of the Rosetta Stone in Egypt had reached the Institut de France, in Paris, by 1801. There Gabriel de La Porte du Theil set to work on a translation of the Greek portion, though he was almost immediately dispatched elsewhere on the orders of Napoleon, leaving his unfinished work in the hands of a colleague, Hubert-Pascal Ameilhon. In 1803 Ameilhon produced the first published translations of the Greek text, in both Latin and French to ensure that it would circulate widely.
