= Jean-Antoine Letronne =

French archaeologist (1787–1848)

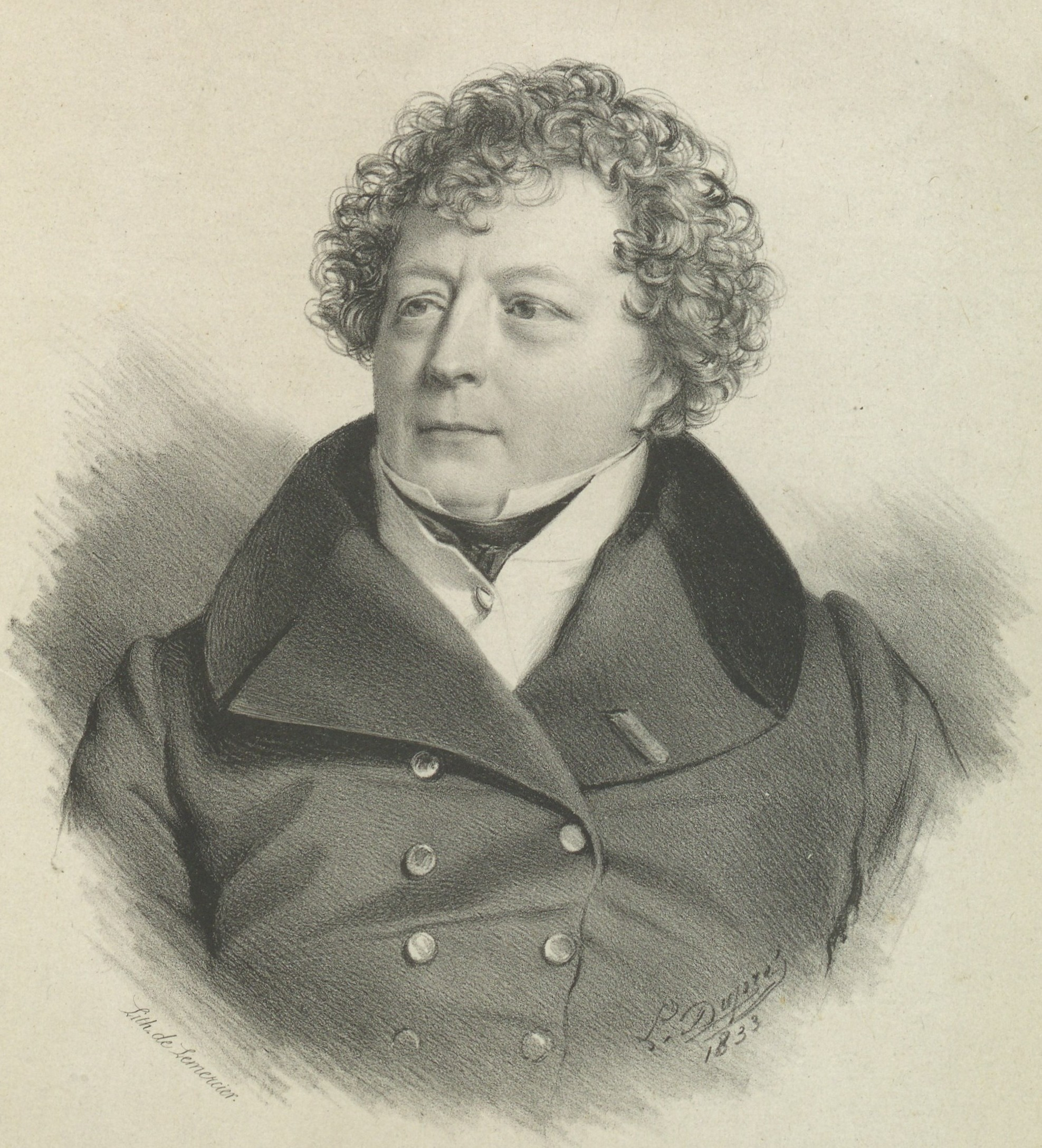
Jean Antoine Letronne, lithography by Louis Dupré, 1833

Jean Antoine Letronne (25 January 1787 – 14 December 1848) was a French archaeologist.

== Life ==
Letronne was born in Paris. His father, a poor engraver, sent him to study art under the painter David, but his own tastes were literary, and he became a student in the Collège de France, where it is said he used to exercise his already strongly developed critical faculty by correcting old translations of Greek authors and afterwards comparing the results with the latest and most approved editions.

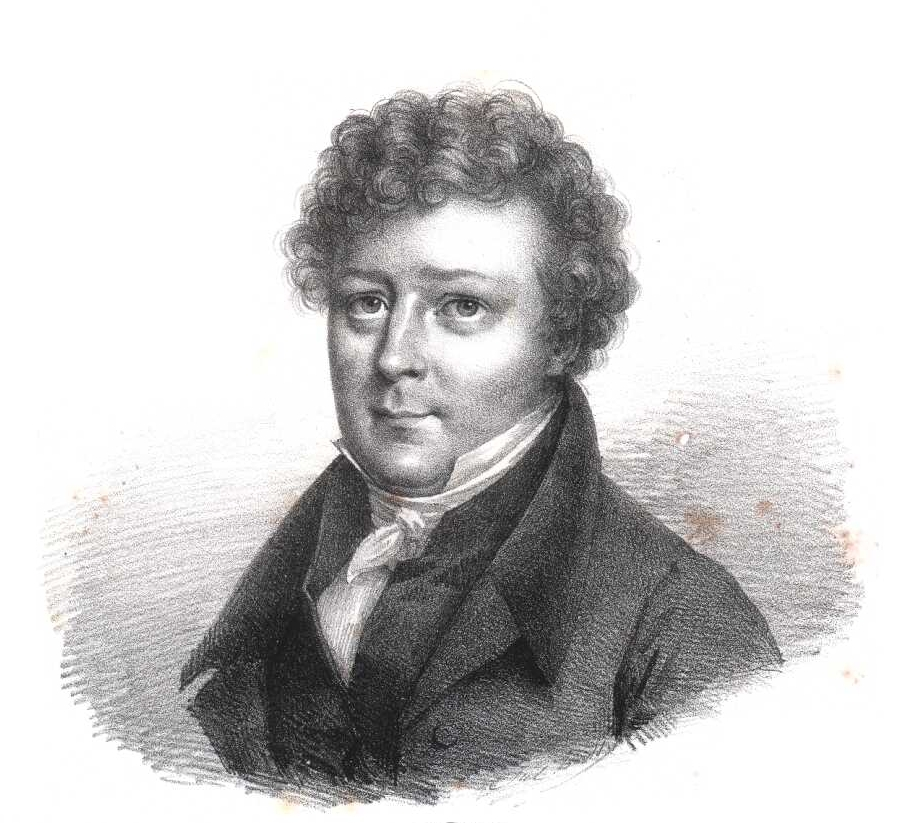
Jean Antoine Letronne, Lithography by Julien Leopold Boilly, 1796-1874

From 1810 to 1812 he travelled in France, Switzerland and Italy, and on his return to Paris published a paper entitled Essai critique sur la topographie de Syracuse, designed to elucidate Thucydides. Two years later appeared his Recherches geographiques et critiques on the De Mensura Orbis Terrae of Dicuil. In 1815 he was commissioned by government to complete the translation of Strabo which had been begun by François-Jean-Gabriel de La Porte du Theil, and in March 1816 he was one of those who were admitted to the Academy of Inscriptions by royal ordinance, having previously contributed On the Metrical System of the Egyptians.

Further promotion came rapidly: in 1817 he was appointed director of the École Nationale des Chartes, in 1829 inspector-general of the university, and in 1831 professor of history in the Collège de France. This chair he exchanged in 1838 for that of archaeology, and in 1840 he succeeded Pierre Claude François Daunou as keeper of the national archives.

Meanwhile, he published, among other works, Considérations générales sur l'évaluation des monnaies grecques et romaines, et sur la valeur de l'or et de l'argent avant la découverte de l'Amérique in 1817, Recherches pour servir à l'histoire de l'Egypte pendant la domination des Grecs et des Romains in 1823, and Sur l'origine grecque des zodiaques pretendus egyptiens in 1837. By the last-named he finally exploded a fallacy which had up to that time vitiated the chronology of contemporary Egyptologists. His Diplômes et chartes de l'époque mérovingienne, sur papyrus et sur vélin were published in 1844. The most important work of Letronne is the Recueil des inscriptions grecques et latines de l'Égypte, of which the first volume appeared in 1842, and the second in 1848.

Letronne is also known as one of the earliest proponents of the Flat Earth Myth.

== Publications ==
- Essai sur la topographie de Syracuse dans le cinquième siècle avant J.-C., Paris, 1812.
- « Lettre sur Eunapius », Magasin encyclopédique, avril, 1813
- Dictionnaire géographique de Vosgien, nouvelle édition augmentée et refondue, 1813 (under the pseudonym Auguste L***)
- Géographie de toutes les parties du monde, Paris, 1816.
- Recherches sur les fragments d'Héron d'Alexandrie, ou Histoire du système métrique des Égyptiens depuis le règne de Pharaon jusqu'à l'invasion des Arabes, 1816 (mémoire couronné par l'Académie des Inscriptions).
- Considérations générales sur l'évaluation des monnaies grecques et romaines, et sur la valeur de l'or et de l'argent avant la découverte de l'Amérique, mémoire lu à l'Académie dans les séances des 30 mai, 13 et 27 juin et 11 juillet 1817.
- Œuvres complètes de Rollin, t.I (nouvelle édition accompagnée d'observations et d'éclaircissements historiques, par Antoine Jean Letronne), Firmin Didot, Paris, 1821 (publication des œuvres de Charles Rollin) (series 30 volumes).
- Mémoire sur le tombeau d'Osymandyas, 1822
- Recherches pour servir à l'histoire de l'Égypte pendant la domination des Grecs et des Romains, tirées des inscriptions grecques et latines relatives à la chronologie, à l'état des arts, aux usages civils et religieux de ce pays, 1823
- Œuvres complètes de Rollin, vol. 16 (Histoire romaine t.IV), Paris, 1823 (publication of Charles Rollin's works).
- « Notice sur la traduction d'Hérodote de M. A.-L. Miot, et sur le Prospectus d'une nouvelle traduction d'Hérodote de M. P.-L. Courrier », Journal des Savants, 1823.
- Inscription grecque, gravée sur la base d'une statue trouvée dans les fouilles du canal d'Alexandrie, et maintenant dans la collection Drovetti à Turin, 1824.
- Observations critiques et archéologiques sur l'objet des représentations zodiacales qui nous restent de l'antiquité, à l'occasion du zodiaque égyptien peint dans une caisse de momie, qui porte une inscription grecque du temps de Trajan, 1824
- Cours élémentaire de géographie ancienne et moderne, rédigé sur un nouveau plan, 9e édition, 1825.
- Tabulae octo nummorum, ponderum, mensurarum apud Romanos et Graecos, 1825.
- Lettre à M. Joseph Passalacqua sur un papyrus grec et sur quelques fragmens de plusieurs papyrus appartenant à sa collection d'antiquités égyptiennes (avec un fac similé du papyrus), Paris, 1826.
- Matériaux pour l'histoire du Christianisme en Égypte, en Nubie et en Abyssinie, contenus dans trois mémoires académiques sur des inscriptions grecques des Ve et VIe, Imprimerie royale, Paris, 1832.
- La Statue vocale de Memnon, considérée dans ses rapports avec l'Égypte et la Grèce, 1833.
- Lettres d'un antiquaire à un artiste : sur l'emploi de la peinture historique murale dans la décoration des temples et des autres édifices publics ou particuliers chez les Grecs et les Romains; ouvrage pouvant servir de suite et de supplément à tous ceux qui traitent de l'histoire de l'art dans l'antiquité, 1835.
- Appendice aux lettres d'un antiquaire, etc., 1837.
- Lettre des conservateurs de la Bibliothèque royale : sur l'ordonnance du 22 février 1839 relative à cet établissement / Jomard, Raoul-Rochette, Letronne, Champolion-Figeac, ..[et al.]
- Fragments des poèmes géographiques de Scymnus de Chio et du faux Dicéarque : restitués principalement d'après un manuscrit de la Bibliothèque royale, 1840
- Sur l'origine du zodiaque grec et sur plusieurs points de l'astronomie et de la chronologie des Chaldéens, 1840
- « Sur les écrits et les travaux d'Eudoxe de Cnide, d'après M. Ludwig Ideler, membre de l'Académie de Berlin, et sur quelques points relatifs à l'histoire de l'astronomie et à la chronologie anciennes », Journal des savants, 1840–41
- « Inscription grecque de Rosette [éd. grecque et trad. française] », Fragmenta historicorum graecorum, 1, éd. par Karl et Theodor Müller, Paris, 1841, p. I-VIII et 1-44 (Read online).
- Mémoire sur l'utilité qu'on peut retirer de l'étude des noms propres grecs, pour l'histoire et l'archéologie, 1845. (Read online)
- Fragments inédits d'anciens poètes grecs : tirés d'un papyrus appartenant au Musée Royal, avec la copie entière de ce papyrus : suivis du texte et de la traduction de deux autres papyrus appartenant au même musée, 1841
- Recueil des inscriptions grecques et latines de l'Égypte, vol. I, Paris, 1842.
- « Inscription grecque accompagnée des noms hiéroglyphiques de Marc-Aurèle et de Lucius Vérus trouvée à Philes en Égypte », Journal des savants, 1843
- Examen critique de la découverte du prétendu cœur de Saint-Louis, faite à la Sainte Chapelle le 15 mai 1843, 1844
- Table d'Abydos imprimée en caractères mobiles, 1845
- Analyse critique des représentations zodiacales de Dendéra et d'Esné, 1845
- Diplômes et chartes de l'époque mérovingienne, sur papyrus et sur vélin, conservés aux Archives du royaume, publiés sous les auspices des ministres de l'intérieur et de l'instruction publique, Kaeppelin, Paris, 1845.
- Sur l'authenticité de la lettre de Thibaud, roi de Navarre à l'évêque de Tusculum, 1846
- Recueil des inscriptions grecques et latines de l'Égypte, vol. II, Paris, 1848.
- Mélanges d'érudition et de critique historique, Paris, 1860 (recueil d'articles et de travaux déjà parus, précédés par l'« Éloge de A.-J. Letronne lu à l'Académie des Inscriptions et Belles-Lettres dans sa séance annuelle du 16 août 1850 » par le baron Walckenaer).
- Œuvres choisies, 1881-1885

| Preceded by Jean-François Champollion | Chair of Archeology at the Collège de France; 1837–1848 | Succeeded by Charles Lenormant |
