= Jane Masséglia =

Historian and lecturer in England

Jane Elizabeth Ann Masséglia FSA

Academic work
- Discipline: Ancient History
- Institutions: University of Oxford; Ashmolean Museum; University of Leicester

Jane Elizabeth Ann Masséglia (née Anderson) FSA is an ancient historian and classical archaeologist, currently Associate Professor of Ancient History at the University of Leicester.

== Biography ==
Masséglia studied for a first degree in Literae humaniores at Exeter College, Oxford before gaining a PGCE and teaching Latin, Greek, and Classical Civilisations. She gained her DPhil from Lincoln College, Oxford. She is the Senior Scientist for the European Research Council project 'LatinNow'. She was elected as a fellow of the Society of Antiquaries of London on 13 February 2020.

== Select publications ==
- Anderson, J.E.A. 2007. "Two sides to every story: a tale of love and hate on a Lakonian stele", Sparta: Journal of Spartan and Ancient Greek History 3.2, pp23–28.
- Masséglia, J. 2012. "Reasons to be Cheerful? The Drunken Old Woman of Munich and Rome" in A. Chaniotis (ed.), Unveiling Emotions: Sources and Methods for the Study of Emotions in the Greek World. Stuttgart, HABES. 413–440.
- Masséglia, J. (with Ahmet Ertug and R.R.R. Smith) 2014 Ancient Theaters of Anatolia. Istanbul.
- Masséglia, J. 2015. Body Language in Hellenistic Art and Society (Oxford Studies in Ancient Culture and Representation). Oxford, Oxford University Press.
- Masséglia, J. (ed.) 2016. The Philae Obelisk (The Classics Conclave; Oxford: Centre for the Study of Ancient Documents).
- Masséglia, J. 2016. "Rome’s Walking Dead: Resurrecting a Roman funeral at the Ashmolean Museum", Journal of Classics Teaching doi:10.1017/S2058631016000088
