= Gabal Tingar =

Mountain in Egypt

- Location within Egypt

Highest point
- Coordinates: 24°5′07″N 32°52′05″E

Geography
- Location: Egypt

Gabal Tingar is a small mountain in Egypt, used as a granodiorite quarry in ancient times. The site is located on the west bank of the River Nile, west of Elephantine, near Aswan. It is thought to have been the source for the stone that was used to create the stele that the Rosetta Stone came from.

The quarry was likely used from the time of the New Kingdom through the Roman period of rule in Egypt, though the workings that remain visible were likely for the construction of the later monastery of Saint Simeon nearby.
