= Polynomial texture mapping =

Digital imaging technique

Polynomial texture mapping (PTM), also known as Reflectance Transformation Imaging (RTI), is a technique of imaging and interactively displaying objects under varying lighting conditions to reveal surface phenomena. The data acquisition method is single camera multi light (SCML).

== Origins ==
The method was originally developed by Tom Malzbender of HP Labs in order to generate enhanced 3D computer graphics and it has since been adopted for cultural heritage applications.

== Methodology ==
A series of images is captured in a darkened environment with the camera in a fixed position and the object lit from different angles (Single Camera Multi Light). Interactive software processes and combines the set of images to enable the user inspecting the object to control a virtual light source. The virtual light source may be manipulated to simulate light from different angles and of different intensity or wavelengths to illuminate the surface of artefacts and reveal details. Open-source tools for processing the captured images and publishing the resulting relightable images on the web are freely available.

== Applications ==
Polynomial texture mapping may be used for detailed recording and documentation, 3D modeling, edge detection, and to aid the study of inscriptions, rock art and other artefacts. It has been applied to hundreds of the Vindolanda tablets by the Centre for the Study of Ancient Documents at the University of Oxford in conjunction with the British Museum. It has also been deployed, by Ben Altshuler of the Institute for Digital Archaeology, to scan the Philae obelisk at Kingston Lacy and the Parian Chronicle at the Ashmolean Museum; in both cases scans revealed significant, previously illegible text. Method was also used for identifying microscopic worked antler from Star Carr and recording ancient rock art in Armenia.

A 'dome' supporting twenty-four lights has been used to image paintings in the National Gallery and produce polynomial texture maps, providing information on condition phenomena for conservation purposes. Studies of the technique at the National Gallery and Tate concluded that it is an effective tool for documenting changes in the condition of paintings, more easily repeatable than raking light photography, and therefore could be used to assess paintings during structural treatment and before and after loan. Twelve dome-based systems built by the University of Southampton have been used to capture thousands of cuneiform tablets at various museums.

The technique is now also finding uses in the field of forensic science, for example in imaging footprints, tyre marks, and indented writing.

== See also ==
- Multispectral image
