= History of Alexandria =

History of the Egyptian city

Plan of Alexandria c. 30 BC

The history of Alexandria dates back to the city's founding, by Alexander the Great, in 331 BC. Yet, before that, there were large port cities just east of Alexandria, at the western edge of what is now Abu Qir Bay. The Canopic (westernmost) branch of the Nile Delta still existed at that time, and was widely used for shipping.

After its foundation, Alexandria became the seat of the Ptolemaic Kingdom, and quickly grew to be one of the greatest cities of the Hellenistic world. Only Rome, which gained control of Egypt in 30 BC, eclipsed Alexandria in size and wealth.

The city fell to the Arabs in AD 641, and a new capital of Egypt, Fustat, was founded on the Nile. After Alexandria's status as the country's capital ended, it fell into a long decline, which by the late Ottoman period, had seen it reduced to little more than a small fishing village. The French army under Napoleon captured the city in 1798 and the British soon captured it from the French, retaining Alexandria within their sphere of influence for 150 years. The city grew in the early 19th century under the industrialization program of Mohammad Ali, the viceroy of Egypt.

The current city is the Republic of Egypt's leading port, a commercial, tourism and transportation center, and the heart of a major industrial area where refined petroleum, asphalt, cotton textiles, processed food, paper, plastics and styrofoam are produced.

== Early settlements in the area ==
Just east of Alexandria in ancient times (where now is Abu Qir Bay) there was marshland and several islands. As early as the 7th century BC, there existed important port cities of Canopus and Heracleion. The latter was recently rediscovered under water. Part of Canopus is still on the shore above water, and had been studied by archaeologists the longest. There was also the town of Menouthis. The Nile Delta had long been politically significant as the point of entry for anyone wishing to trade with Egypt.

An Egyptian city or town, Rhakotis, existed on the shore where Alexandria is now. Behind it were five villages scattered along the strip between Lake Mareotis and the sea, according to the Romance of Alexander.

== Foundation ==
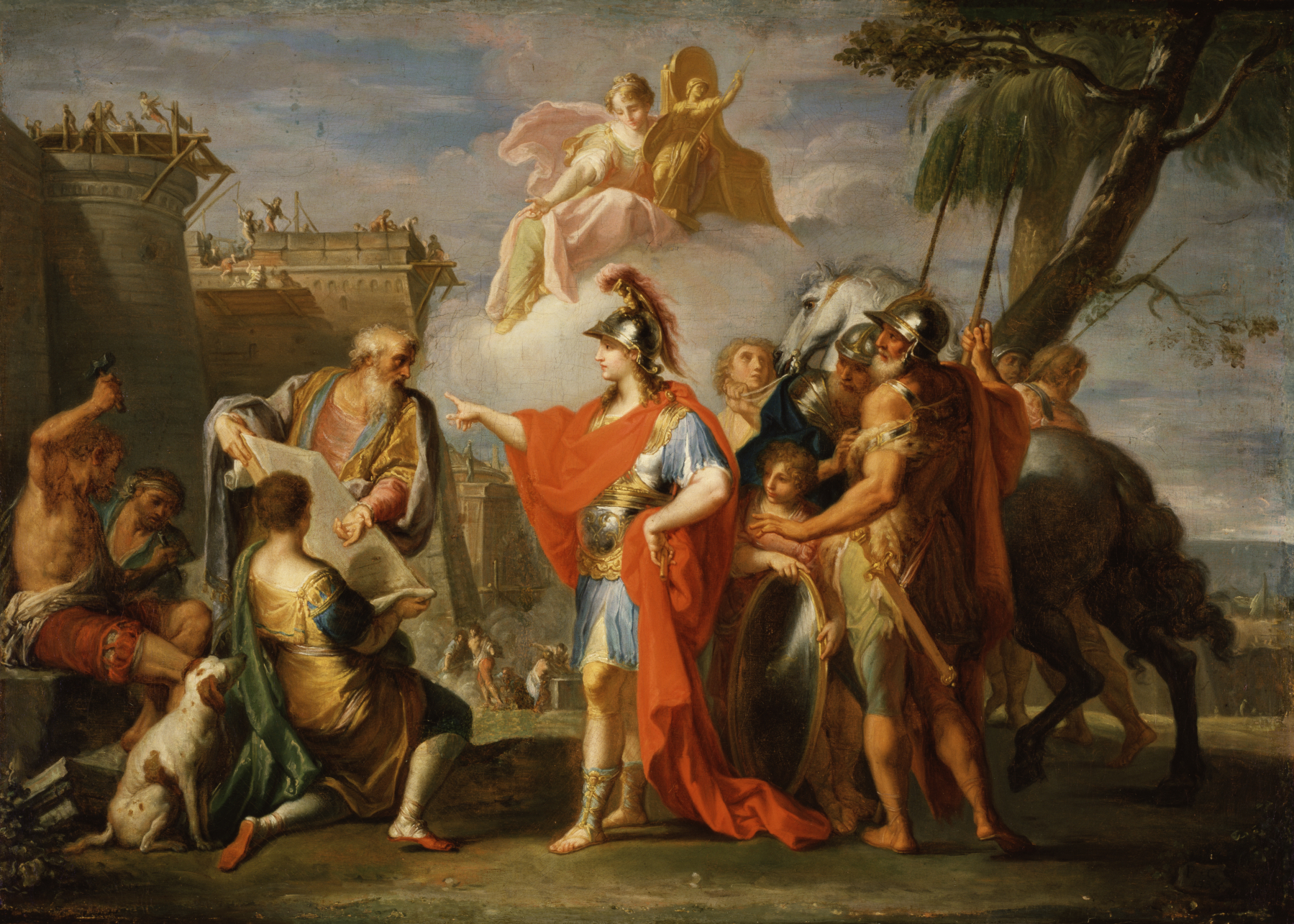
Alexander the Great Founding Alexandria by Placido Costanzi (1736-1737)

Alexandria was founded by Alexander the Great in 331 BC (the exact date is disputed) as Ἀλεξάνδρεια (Aleksándreia). Alexander's chief architect for the project was Dinocrates. Ancient accounts are extremely numerous and varied, and much influenced by subsequent developments. One of the more sober descriptions, given by the historian Arrian, tells how Alexander undertook to lay out the city's general plan, but lacking chalk or other means, resorted to sketching it out with grain. A number of more fanciful foundation myths are found in the Alexander Romance and were picked up by medieval historians.

A few months after the foundation, Alexander left Egypt for the East and never returned to his city. After Alexander departed, his viceroy, Cleomenes, continued the expansion of the city.

In a struggle with the other successors of Alexander, his general, Ptolemy (later Ptolemy I of Egypt) succeeded in bringing Alexander's body to Alexandria. Alexander's tomb became a famous tourist destination for ancient travelers (including Julius Caesar). With the symbols of the tomb and the Lighthouse, the Ptolemies promoted the legend of Alexandria as an element of their legitimacy to rule.

Alexandria was intended to supersede Naucratis as a Hellenistic center in Egypt, and to be the link between Greece and the rich Nile Valley. If such a city was to be on the Egyptian coast, there was only one possible site, behind the screen of the Pharos island and removed from the silt thrown out by the Nile, just west of the westernmost "Canopic" mouth of the river. At the same time, the city could enjoy a fresh water supply by means of a canal from the Nile. The site also offered unique protection against invading armies: the vast Libyan Desert to the west and the Nile Delta to the east.

Though Cleomenoes was mainly in charge of seeing to Alexandria's continuous development, the Heptastadion (causeway to Pharos Island) and the main-land quarters seem to have been mainly Ptolemaic work. Demographic details of how Alexandria rose quickly to its great size remain unknown.

== Ptolemaic era ==
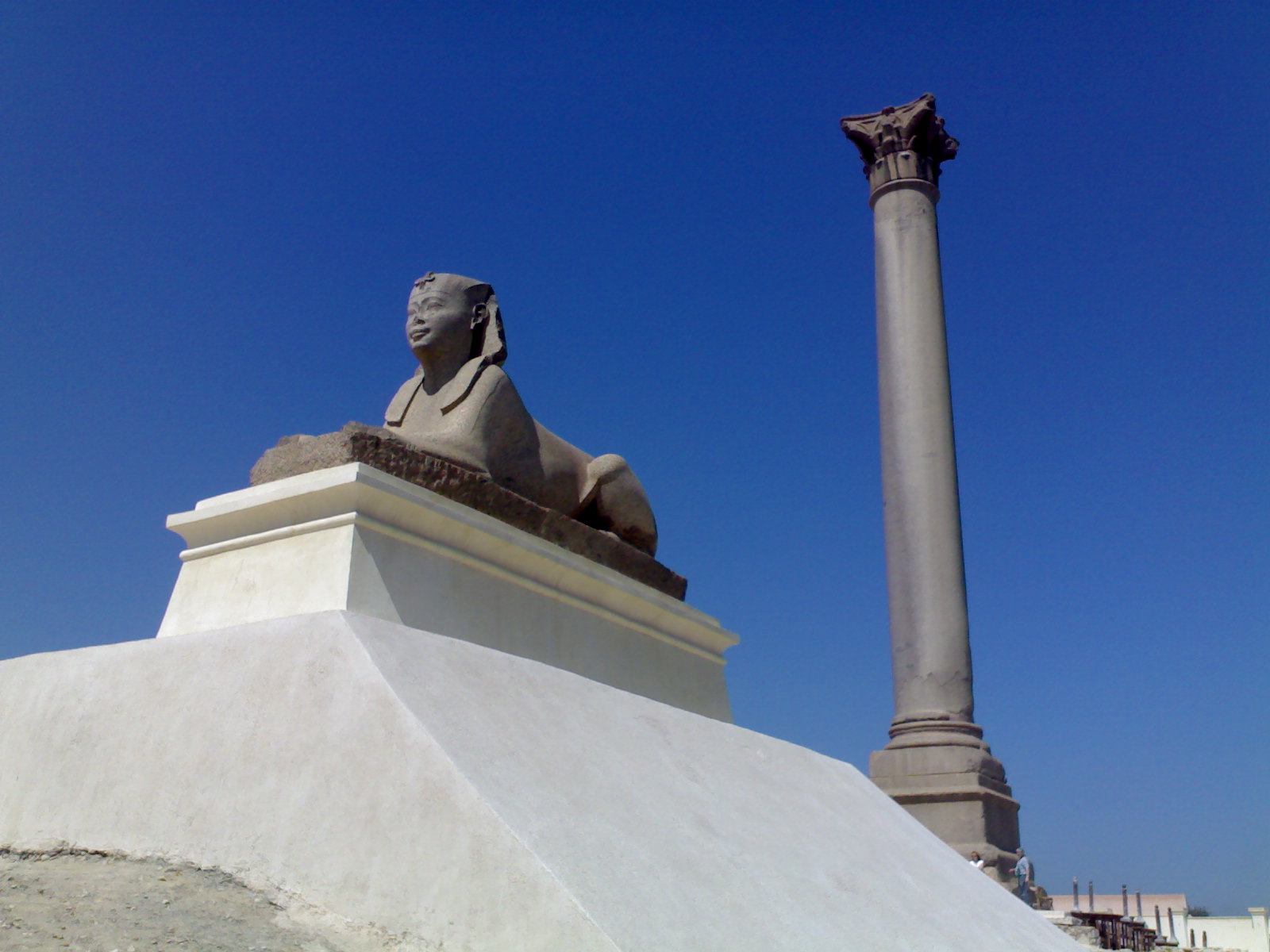
Alexandria, sphinx made of pink granite, Ptolemaic, Pompey's Pillar.

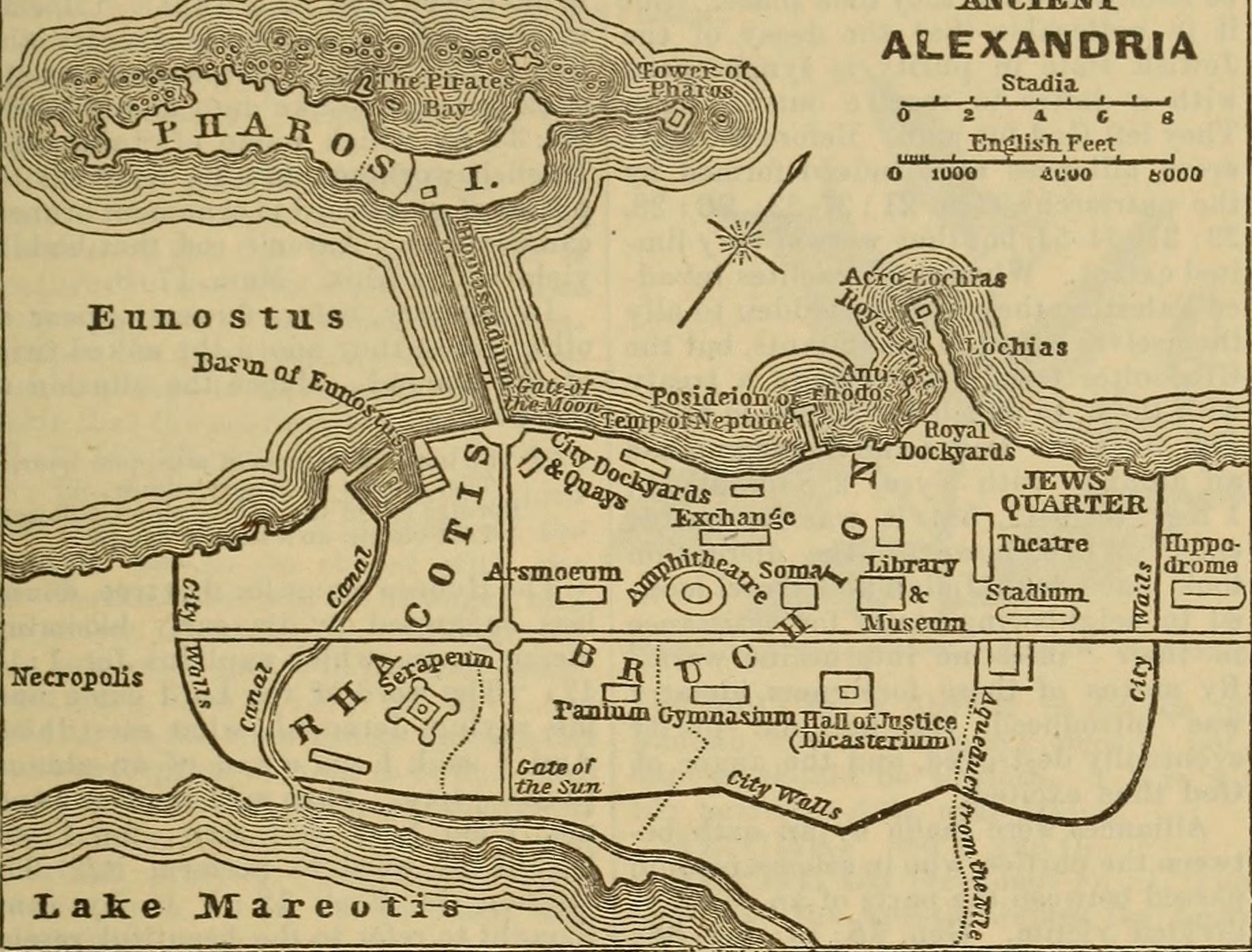
Map of ancient Alexandria

Inheriting the trade of ruined Tyre and becoming the center of the new commerce between Europe and the Arabian and Indian East, the city grew in less than a generation to be larger than Carthage. In a century, Alexandria had become the largest city in the world, and for some centuries more, was second only to Rome. It became the main Greek city of Egypt, with an extraordinary mix of Greeks from many cities and backgrounds. Nominally a free Hellenistic city, Alexandria retained its senate of Roman times and the judicial functions of that body were restored by Septimius Severus after temporary abolition by Augustus.

=== Construction ===
Monumental buildings were erected in Alexandria through the third century BC. The Heptastadion connected Pharos with the city and the Lighthouse of Alexandria followed soon after, as did the Serapeum, all under Ptolemy I. The Museion was built under Ptolemy II; the Serapeum expanded by Ptolemy III Euergetes; and mausolea for Alexander and the Ptolemies built under Ptolemy IV.

=== Library of Alexandria ===
The Ptolemies fostered the development of the Library of Alexandria and associated Musaeum into a renowned center for Hellenistic learning.

Luminaries associated with the Musaeum included the geometry and number-theorist Euclid; the astronomer Hipparchus; and Eratosthenes, known for calculating the Earth's circumference and for his algorithm for finding prime numbers, who became head librarian.

Strabo lists Alexandria, with Tarsus and Athens, among the learned cities of the world, observing also that Alexandria both admits foreign scholars and sends its natives abroad for further education.

=== Ethnic divisions ===
The early Ptolemies were careful to maintain the distinction of its population's three largest ethnicities: Greek, Jewish, and Egyptian. (At first, Egyptians were probably the plurality of residents, while the Jewish community remained small. Slavery, a normal institution in Greece, was likely present but details about its extent and about the identity of slaves are unknown.) Alexandrian Greeks placed an emphasis on Hellenistic culture, in part to exclude and subjugate non-Greeks.

The law in Alexandria was based on Greek—especially Attic—law. There were two institutions in Alexandria devoted to the preservation and study of Greek culture, which helped to exclude non-Greeks. In literature, non-Greek texts entered the library only once they had been translated into Greek. Notably, there were few references to Egypt or native Egyptians in Alexandrian poetry; one of the few references to native Egyptians presents them as "muggers." There were ostentatious religious processions in the streets that displayed the wealth and power of the Ptolemies, but also celebrated and affirmed Greekness. These processions were used to shout Greek superiority over any non-Greeks that were watching, thereby widening the divide between cultures.

From this division arose much of the later turbulence, which began to manifest itself under the rule of Ptolemy Philopater (221–204 BC). The reign of Ptolemy VIII Physcon from 144–116 BC was marked by purges and civil warfare (including the expulsion of intellectuals such as Apollodorus of Athens), as well as intrigues associated with the king's wives and sons.

Alexandria was also home to the largest Jewish community in the ancient world. The Septuagint, a Greek translation of the Hebrew Bible (the Torah and other writings), was produced there. Jews occupied two of the city's five quarters and worshipped at synagogues.

== Roman era ==
=== Roman annexation ===
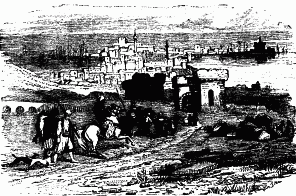
Alexandria

Having been under Roman influence for more than a hundred years, the city was placed formally within Roman jurisdiction by the will of Ptolemy Alexander in 80 BC. Julius Caesar courted Cleopatra in Alexandria in 47 BC and was besieged in the city by Cleopatra's brother and rival. His example was followed by Mark Antony, for whose favor the city paid dearly to Octavian. Following Antony's defeat at the Battle of Actium, Octavian took Egypt as personal property of the emperor, appointing a prefect who reported personally to him rather than to the Roman Senate. While in Alexandria, Octavian took time to visit Alexander's tomb and inspected the late king's remains. On being offered a viewing into the tombs of the pharaohs, he refused, saying, "I came to see a king, not a collection of corpses."

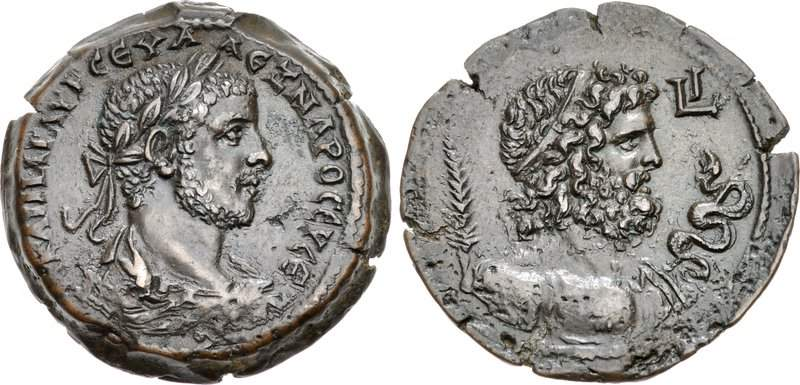
Drachma of Alexandria, 222-235 AD. Obverse: Laureate head of Alexander Severus, KAI(ΣΑΡ) MAP(ΚΟΣ) AYP(ΗΛΙΟΣ) ΣЄY(ΑΣΤΟΣ) AΛЄΞANΔPOΣ ЄYΣЄ(ΒΗΣ). Reverse: Bust of Asclepius.

From the time of annexation and onwards, Alexandria seemed to have regained its old prosperity, commanding, as it did, an important granary of Rome. This was one of the chief reasons that induced Octavian to place it directly under imperial power.

Jewish–Greek ethnic tensions in the era of Roman administration led to riots in AD 38 and again in 66. Buildings were burned during the Kitos War (Tumultus Iudaicus) of AD 115, giving Hadrian and his architect, Decriannus, an opportunity to rebuild.

In 215 AD the emperor Caracalla visited the city and, because of some insulting satires that the inhabitants had directed at him, abruptly commanded his troops to put to death all youths capable of bearing arms. This brutal order seems to have been carried out even beyond the letter, for a general massacre ensued. According to historian Cassius Dio, over 20,000 people were killed.

In the 3rd century AD, Alexander's tomb was closed to the public, and now its location has been forgotten.

=== Late Roman and Byzantine period ===
Even as its main historical importance had sprung from pagan learning, Alexandria now acquired new importance as a center of Christian theology and church government. There, Arianism came to prominence, and there also Athanasius opposed Arianism and the pagan reaction against Christianity, experiencing success against both and continuing the Patriarch of Alexandria's major influence on Christianity into the next two centuries.

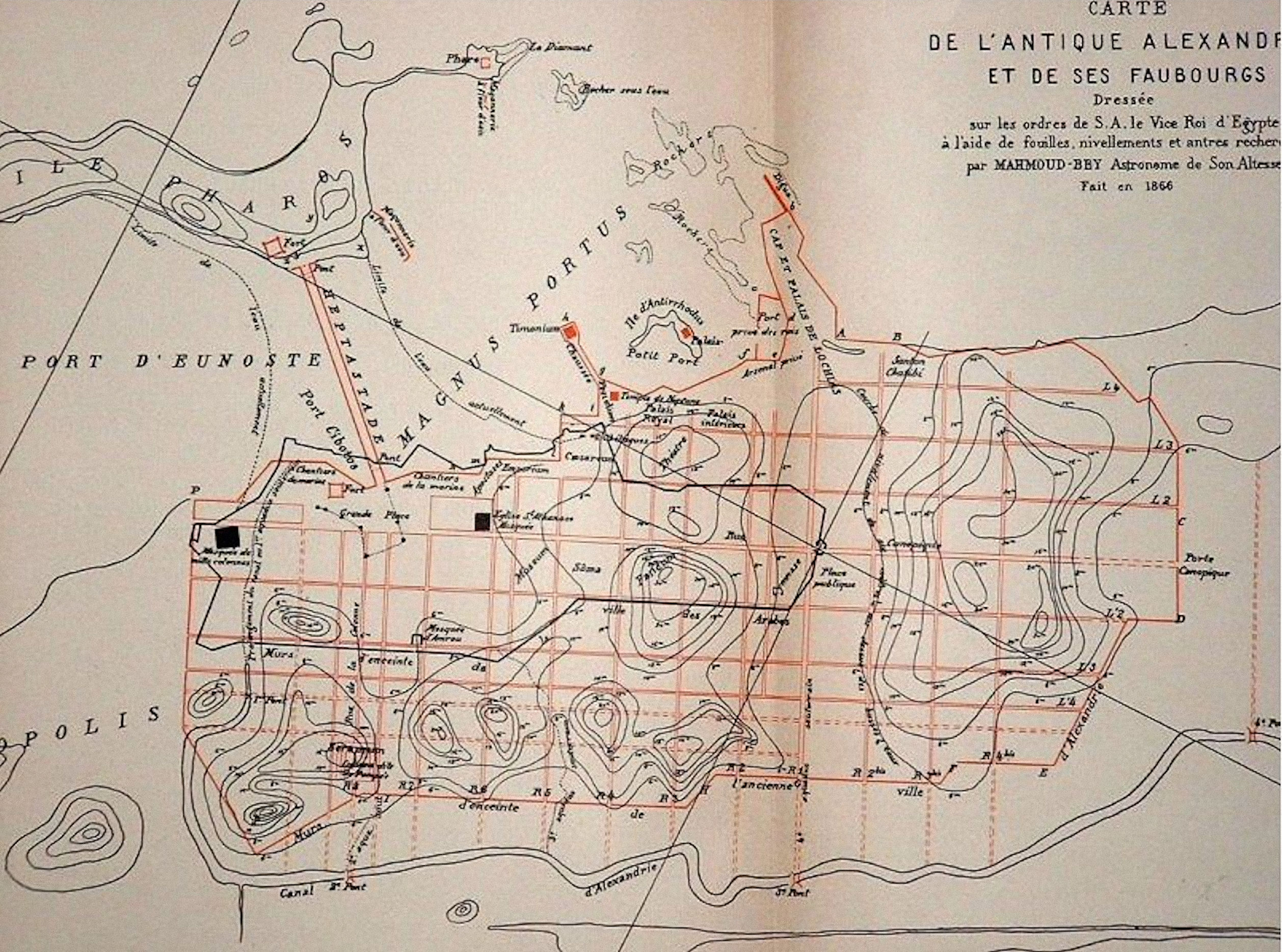
Map of ancient Alexandria created by astronomer Mahmoud-Bey in 1866.

Persecution of Christians under Diocletian (beginning in AD 284) marks the beginning of the Era of Martyrs in the Coptic calendar.

As native influences began to reassert themselves in the Nile valley, Alexandria gradually became an alien city, more and more detached from Egypt and losing much of its commerce as the peace of the empire broke up during the 3rd century, followed by a fast decline in population and splendor.

In 365, a tsunami caused by an earthquake in Crete hit Alexandria.

In the late 4th century, persecution of pagans by Christians had reached new levels of intensity. Temples and statues were destroyed throughout the Roman empire: pagan rituals became forbidden under punishment of death, and libraries were closed. In 391, Emperor Theodosius I ordered the destruction of all pagan temples, and the Patriarch Theophilus complied with his request. The Serapeum of the Great Library was destroyed, possibly effecting the final destruction of the Library of Alexandria. The neoplatonist philosopher Hypatia was publicly murdered by a Christian mob.

The Brucheum and Jewish quarters were desolate in the 5th century, and the central monuments, the Soma and Museum, fell into ruin. On the mainland, life seemed to have centered in the vicinity of the Serapeum and Caesareum, both of which became Christian churches. The Pharos and Heptastadium quarters, however, remained populous and were left intact.

Recent archaeology at Kom El Deka (heap of rubble or ballast) has found the Roman quarter of Alexandria beneath a layer of graves from the Muslim era. The remains found at this site, which are dated circa the fourth to seventh centuries AD, include workshops, storefronts, houses, a theater, a public bath, and lecture halls, as well as Coptic frescoes. The baths and theater were built in the fourth century and the smaller buildings constructed around them, suggesting a sort of urban renewal occurring in the wake of Diocletian.

== Islamic rule ==
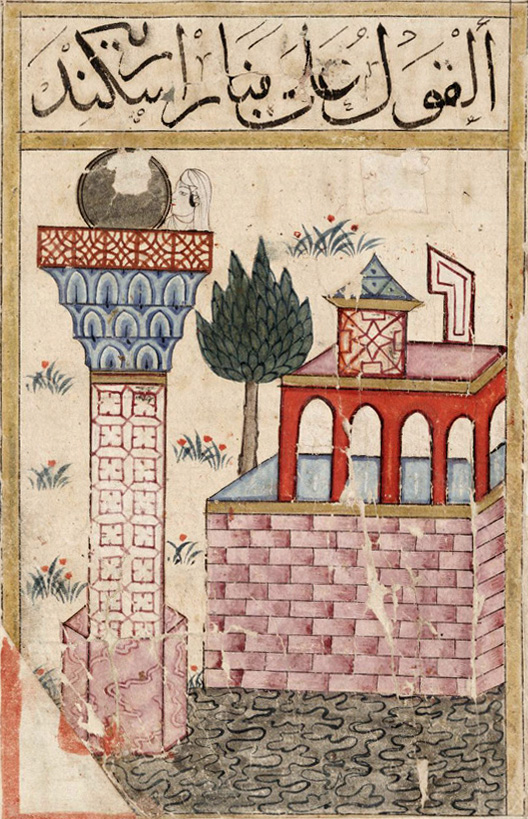
The Lighthouse of Alexandria represented in the 14th century Book of Wonders

In 619, the city was taken by Khosrau II, King of Persia. Although the Byzantine Emperor Heraclius recovered it a few years later, in 641 the Arabs, under the general Amr ibn al-As during the Muslim conquest of Egypt, captured it decisively after a siege that lasted fourteen months. The city received no aid from Constantinople during that time; Heraclius was dead and the new Emperor Constans II was barely twelve years old. In 645 a Byzantine fleet recaptured the city, but it fell for good the following year. Thus ended a period of 975 years of Greco-Roman control over the city.

Nearly two centuries later, between the years 814 and 827, Alexandria came under the control of pirates of Andalusia (Spain today), later to return to Arab hands. In the year 828, the alleged body of Mark the Evangelist was stolen by Venetian merchants, which led to the Basilica of Saint Mark. Years later, the city suffered many earthquakes during the years 956, 1303 and then in 1323.

Throughout the late medieval period and after a long decline, Alexandria emerged as a major metropolis and the most important commercial port in Egypt and one of the most important in the Mediterranean. The Jewish traveller Benjamin of Tudela even described it as “a trading market for all nations”. Indeed, Alexandria was the outlet for all goods coming from Arabia, such as incense, and from India and South-East Asia, such as spices (pepper, cloves, cinnamon, etc.), precious stones, pearls and exotic woods like brazilwood. But it was also the outlet for goods from Africa, such as ivory and precious woods. These goods arrived in Alexandria after passing through Aden on their way to the Red Sea, then headed up the Red Sea to be unloaded in the port of Aydhab. From Aydhab, a caravan took the goods to the Nile, probably to the town of Qus. From there, the goods sailed to Alexandria. These goods then found their way to the Alexandria market alongside Egyptian products.

This route was the cheapest and fastest in comparison with the land routes that reached the Mediterranean from Syria or Constantinople. Latin merchants (Venetians, Genoese, Pisans, Catalans, Provençals, etc.) thus entered this market. As early as the 12th century, the major trading cities had funduqs and consuls in Alexandria. A funduq, in this context is an area, often fortified, within the city dedicated to the community of a trading nation under the authority of a consul. This funduq usually included an inn, a chapel, a notary, warehouses and sometimes even craftsmen's workshops and mills.The consul was responsible for adjudicating disputes between merchants of his nation, and also when a subject of the sultan lodged a complaint against a merchant of their nation.The terms of this installation were often set out in treaties between the sultans and the consuls. In 1290, for example, Genoa signed a treaty with Sultan Qalawun providing for preferential tariffs for Genoese merchants who came to trade in Alexandria via a commercial circuit controlled by the sultan at Alexandria customs. The treaty also reaffirmed the rights of the Genoese, notably that of keeping a funduq. This treaty was part of a policy pursued by the early Mamluk sultans, who encouraged the arrival of merchants from Europe in Alexandria, since this trade not only brought the sultan considerable revenue, but also enabled him to obtain supplies of wood and iron from Europe. Later, in the 14th century, the Latin trade in Alexandria was also very important for the sultans, as it enabled them to obtain supplies of mameluks (slave-soldiers) often sold by Genoese merchants.

As this trade was very important to the sultans, they were keen to control the city's institutions. Indeed, in Alexandria, in addition to an Emir (governor), the sultan sent a customs inspector who answered directly to the nazir al-khas (person in charge of managing the sultan's patrimony). Customs was not only responsible for collecting customs duties, but also for the security of the port and its warehouses. Alexandria customs also played a role in commercial arbitration and was the preferred circuit for the sale of products brought in by the merchants, which took place at auction. These sales were set up to encourage the merchants to sell their products to or through the sultan, rather than selling them freely on the city's markets. Latin merchants also had jurisdictional privileges : in addition to being judged by their consul if a subject of the sultan lodged a complaint against them, Latin merchants could not be judged by the qadis (civil judges) but had to be judged by the mazalim (the sultan's courts).

It formed an emirate of the Ayyubid Empire, where Saladin's elder brother Turan Shah was granted a sinecure to keep him from the front lines of the crusades. In the year 1365, Alexandria was brutally sacked after being taken by the armies of the Crusaders, led by King Peter of Cyprus. By the fourteenth and fifteenth centuries, Venice had eliminated the jurisdiction and its Alexandrian warehouse became the center of the distribution of spices to the Portuguese Cape route to open in 1498, which marked the commercial decline, worsened by the Turkish invasion.

There has been a persistent belief that the Library of Alexandria and its contents were destroyed in 642 during the Arab invasion.

The Lighthouse was destroyed by earthquakes in the 14th century, and by 1700 the city was just a small town amidst the ruins.

Though smaller, the city remained a significant port for Mediterranean trade well through the medieval period under the Mamluk sultanate, playing a part in the trade network of Italian city-states. However, it declined still further under the Ottoman Empire, losing its water supply from the Nile, and its commercial importance, as Rosetta (Rashid) became more useful as a port.

== Modern history ==
=== Napoleonic invasion ===
Alexandria figured prominently in the military operations of Napoleon's expedition to Egypt in 1798. French troops stormed the city on July 2, 1798 and it remained in their hands until the British victory at the Battle of Alexandria on March 21, 1801, following which the British besieged the city which fell to them on 2 September 1801.

Two French savants assessing the population of Alexandria in 1798 estimated 8,000 and 15,000.

=== Muhammad Ali ===
Muhammad Ali, the Ottoman Governor of Egypt, began rebuilding the city around 1810, and by 1850, Alexandria had returned to something akin to its former glory.

=== British occupation ===
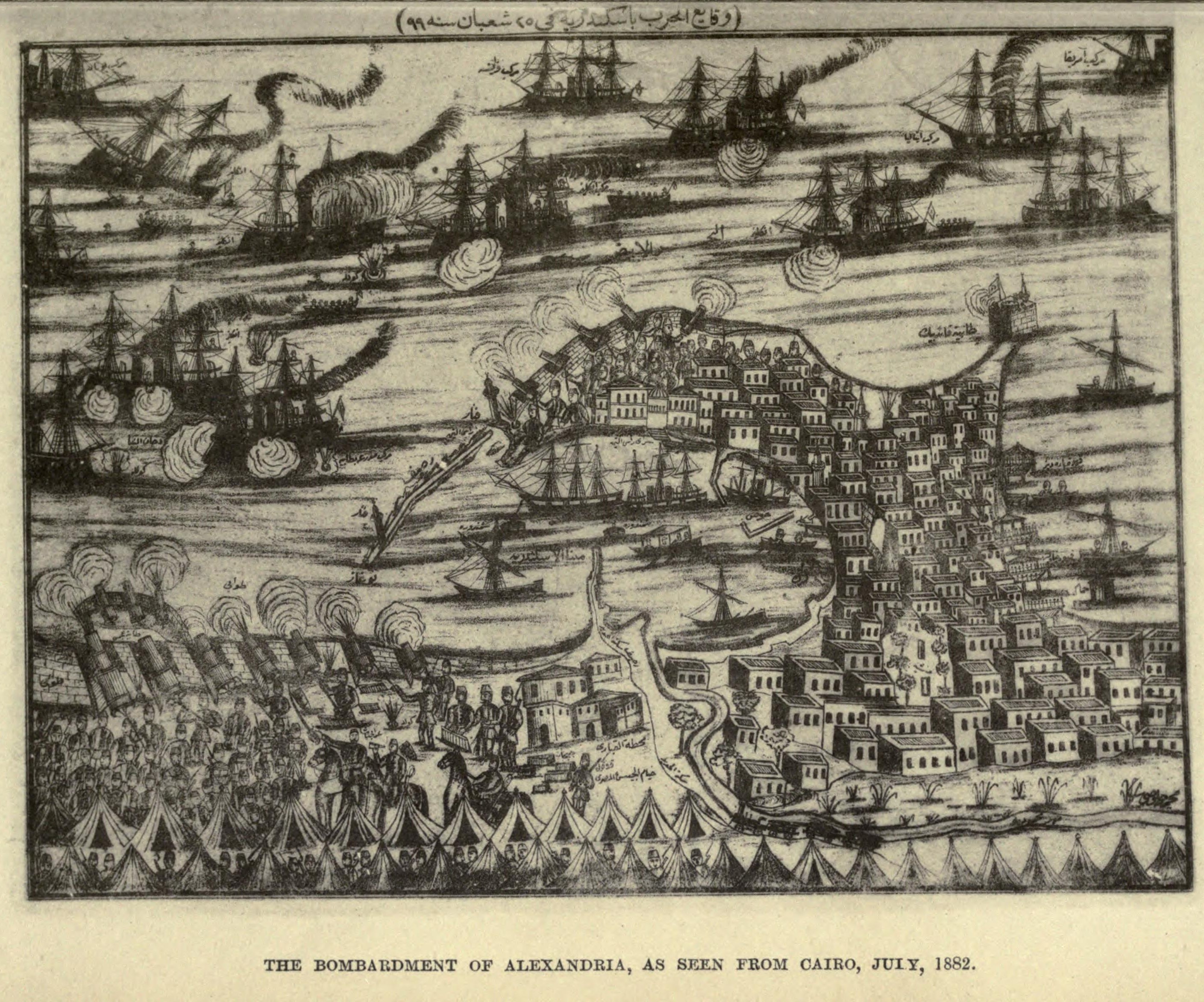
A view of the bombardment of 1882 by an artist in Cairo.

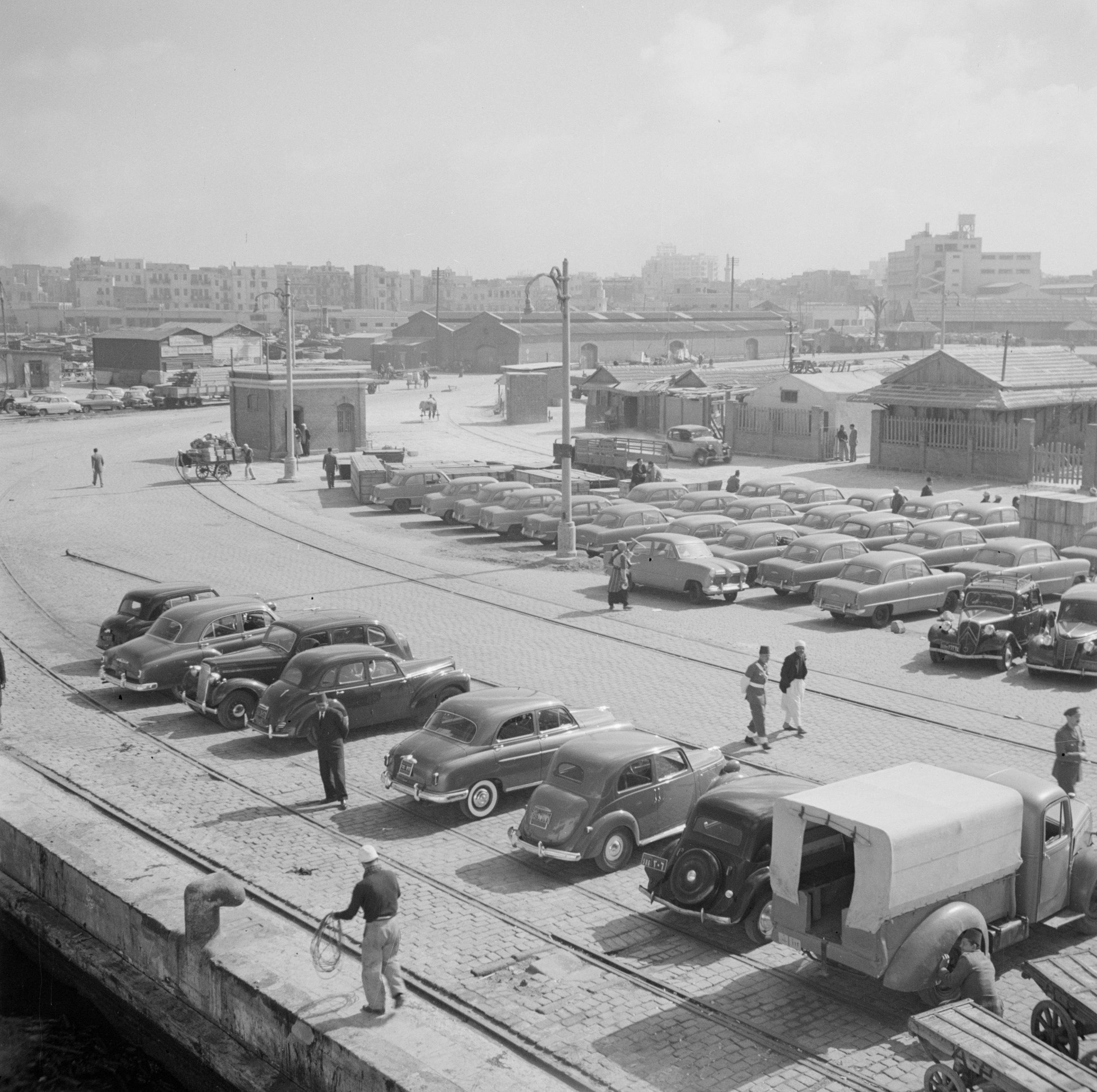
View of a parking lot in Alexandria, 1950.

In July 1882 the city was the site of the first battle of the Anglo-Egyptian War, when it was bombarded and occupied by the Royal Navy. Large sections of the city were damaged in the battle, or destroyed in subsequent fires.

=== Republic of Egypt ===
Relations between Egypt and the United Kingdom grew strained in the 1950s, with violence periodically erupting between local police units and the British Army, in Alexandria as well as in Cairo. These clashes culminated in the Egyptian coup of 1952, during which the army occupied Alexandria and drove King Farouk from his residence at Montaza Palace.

In July 1954, the city was a target of an Israeli bombing campaign that later became known as the Lavon Affair. Only a few months later, Alexandria's Manshia Square was the site of the famous, failed assassination attempt on the life of Gamal Abdel Nasser.

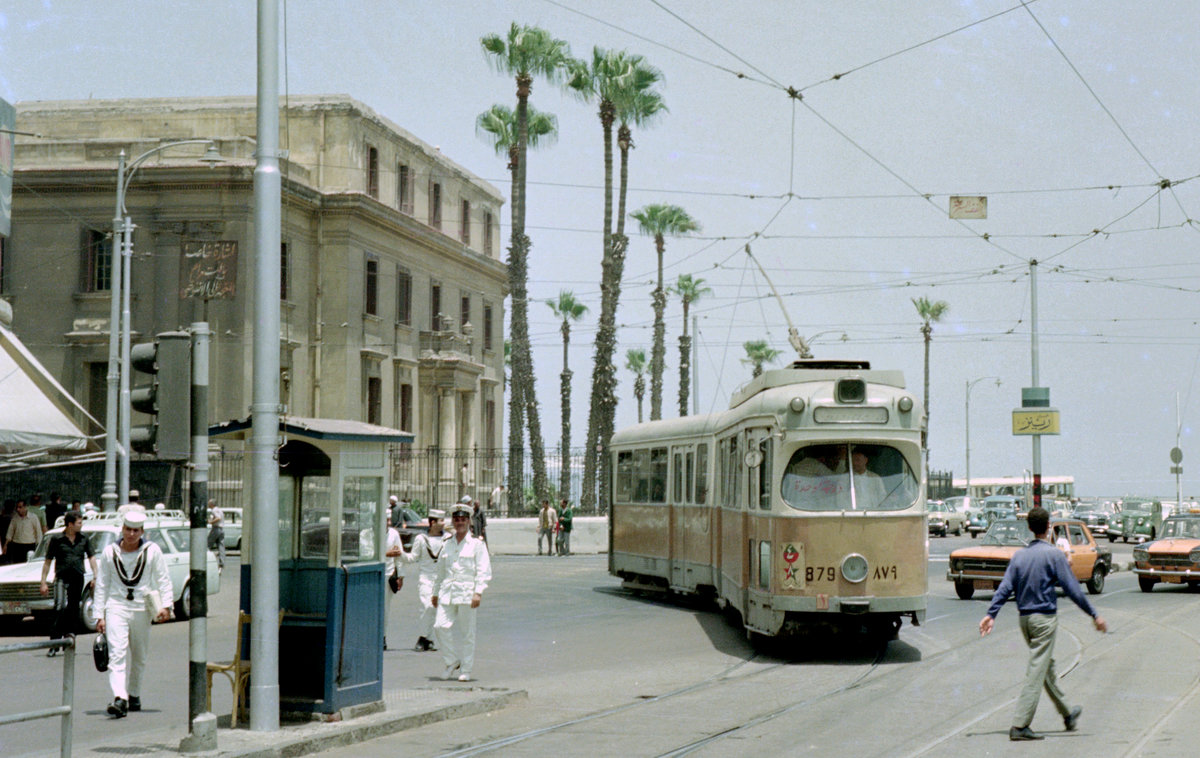
View of Alexandria tram in 1974

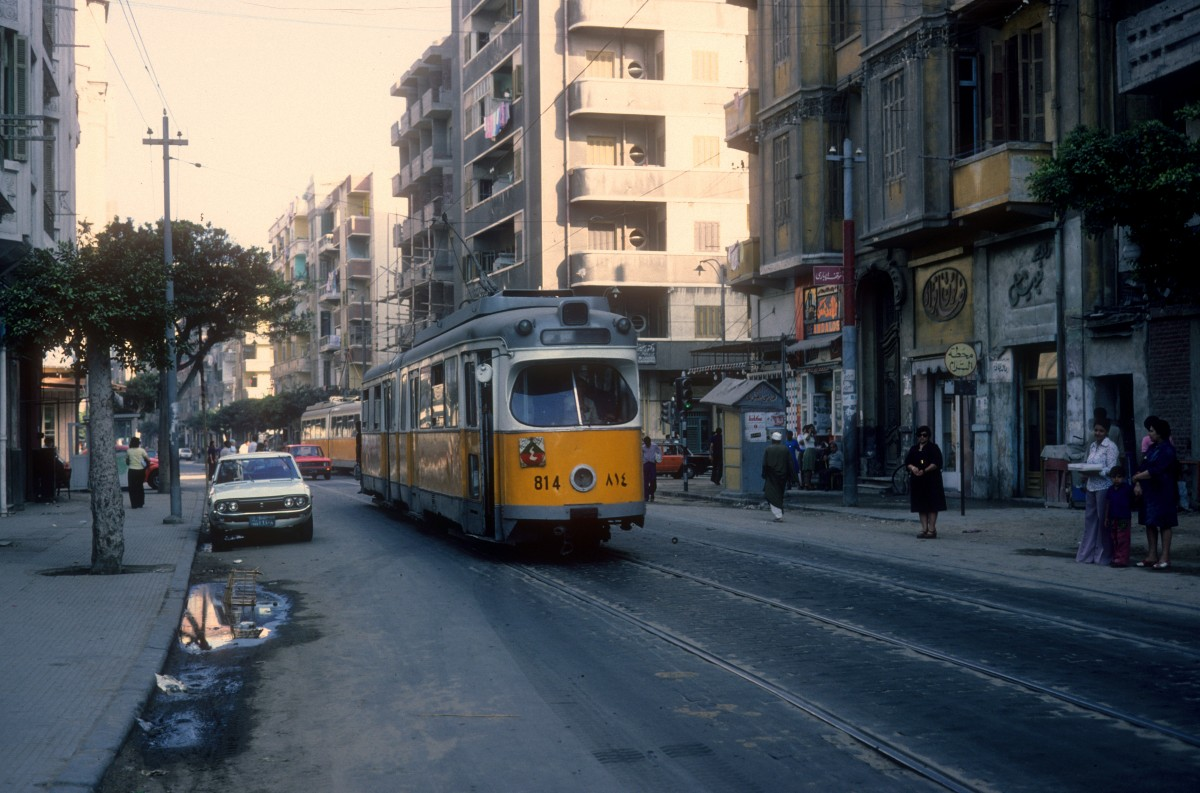
One Duewag GT6 tram in a normal Alexandria street, 1977

Mayors of Alexandria (since the implementation of the local-government act of 1960):

1. Siddiq Abdul-Latif (October 1960 - November 1961)
2. Mohammed Hamdi Ashour (November 1961 - October 1968)
3. Ahmad Kamil (October 1968 - November 1970)
4. Mamdouh Salim (November 1970 - May 1971)
5. Ahmad Fouad Mohyee El-Deen (May 1971 - September 1972)
6. Abdel-Meneem Wahbi (September 1972 - May 1974)
7. Abdel-Tawwab Ahmad Hadeeb (May 1974 - November 1978)
8. Mohammed Fouad Helmi (November 1978 - May 1980)
9. Naeem Abu-Talib (May 1980 - August 1981)
10. Mohammed Saeed El-Mahi (August 1981 - May 1982)
11. Mohammed Fawzi Moaaz (May 1982 - June 1986)
12. Ismail El-Gawsaqi (July 1986 - July 1997)
13. Abdel-Salam El-Mahgoub (1997–2006)
14. Adel Labib (August 2006 - )

=== Arts ===
You won’t find a new country, won’t find another shore.
This city will always pursue you.
You’ll walk the same streets, grow old
in the same neighborhoods, turn gray in these same houses.
You’ll always end up in this city. Don’t hope for things elsewhere:
there’s no ship for you, there’s no road.
Now that you’ve wasted your life here, in this small corner,
you’ve destroyed it everywhere in the world.

— From Constantine P. Cavafy, "The City" (1910), translated by Edmund Keeley

Alexandria was the home of the ethnically Greek poet Constantine P. Cavafy. E. M. Forster, who worked in Alexandria for the International Red Cross during World War I, wrote two books about the city and promoted Cavafy's work.

Lawrence Durrell, working for the British in Alexandria during World War II, achieved international success with the publication of The Alexandria Quartet (1957–1960).

== Recent discoveries ==
In July 2018, archaeologists led by Zeinab Hashish announced the discovery of a 2,000-year-old 30-ton black granite sarcophagus. It contained three damaged skeletons in red-brown sewage water. According to archaeologist Mostafa Waziri, the skeletons looked like a family burial with a middle-aged woman and two men. Researchers also revealed a small gold artifact and three thin sheets of gold.

In June 2022, archaeologists from The Cairo Ministry of Antiquities announced the discovery of an alabaster bust of Alexander the Great as well as molds and other materials for creating amulets for warriors and for statues of Alexander the Great.

== See also ==
- Timeline of Alexandria
