= Naos of the Decades =

Ancient Egyptian naos

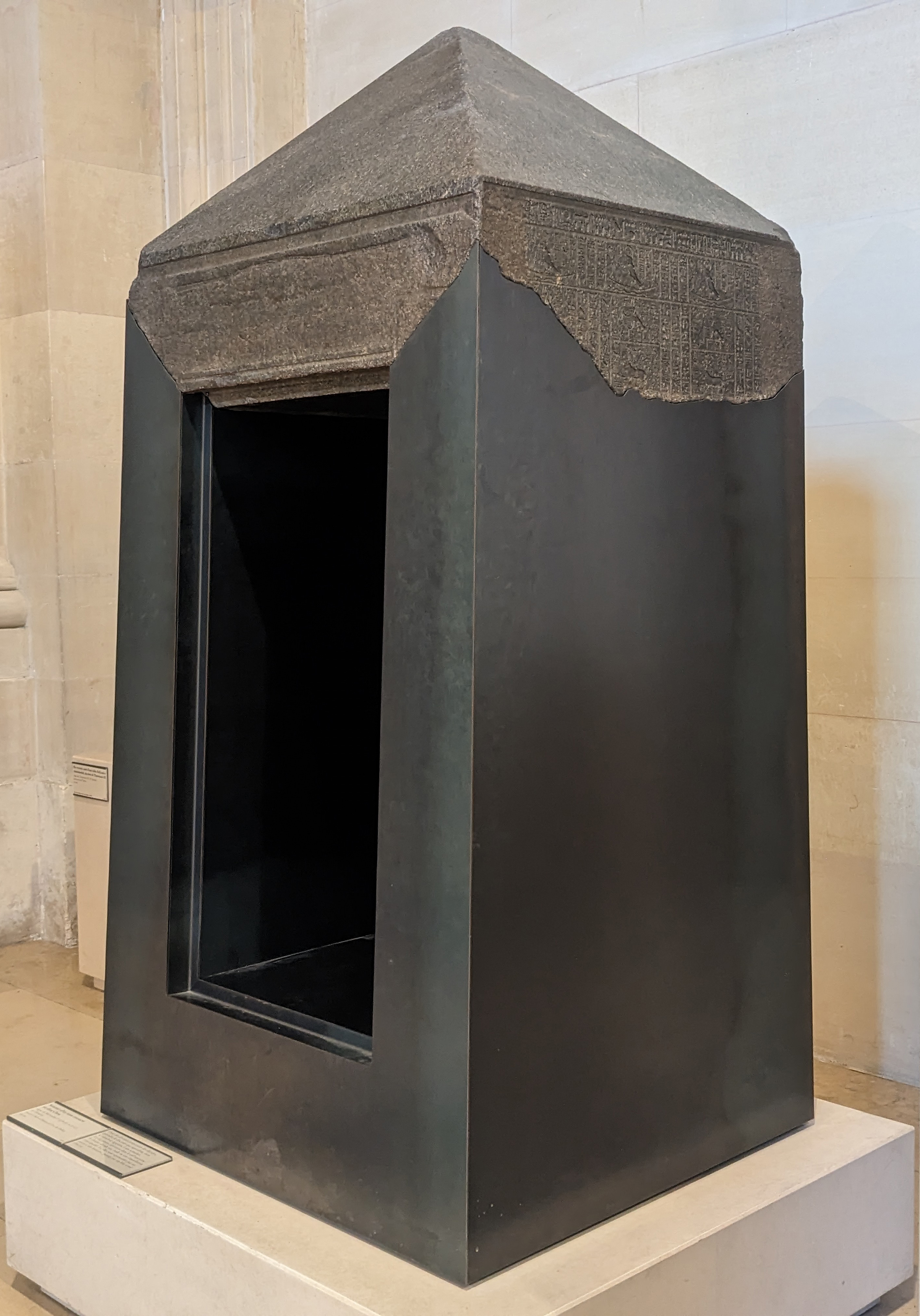
Pyramidion of the Naos of the Decades at the Louvre

Naos of the Decades, also known as the Saft el-Hinna Naos, is a black granite naos preserved in several parts that have been discovered almost two centuries apart.

The naos is dedicated to the god Shu-Sopdu and dates to the reign of Nectanebo I. An astrological calendar is engraved on its sides depicting 36 decans, or 10-day periods marked by small constellations of stars called decans.

== Discovery ==
The upper part of the monument, known as the pyramidion, has been on display in the Louvre Museum since 1817, and it was discovered and brought back by French explorers.

The rest of the naos consists of many pieces. One large piece was found in 1940 by Prince Omar Toussoun and is held at the Graeco-Roman Museum in Alexandria. Other pieces were discovered in 2001 by Franck Goddio during the underwater excavations he organized in search of the sunken cities of Canopus and Heracleion. All of these pieces were found in the Abu Qir Bay.

The complex was brought together for the occasion of an exhibition in 2006, which recounts these excavations and discoveries.
