= Aurélia Masson-Berghoff =

French egyptologist

Aurélia Masson-Berghoff is a French Egyptologist and exhibition curator in the department of ancient Egypt and Sudan at the British Museum.

== Early life ==
Aurélia Masson-Berghoff was an archaeologist at the Centre Franco-Egyptien d'Etude des Temples de Karnak from 2000 to 2007. She obtained her PhD from the University of Paris IV Sorbonne in 2008 for a dissertation on the "Priests' Quarter" in the temenos of Amun at Karnak.

== Career ==
Masson-Berghoff was a lecturer at the University of Cambridge and a post-doctoral fellow at the Université libre de Bruxelles where she participated in research on "Pottery in Ancient Societies: Production, distribution and uses". She joined the British Museum in 2012 as the project curator of the Naukratis project, in which capacity she was responsible for recording and analysing Egyptian material from the early excavations there.

In 2015–2016, Masson-Berghoff is the lead curator for Sunken Cities: Egypt's Lost World, which featured materials from the sunken cities of Thônis–Heracleion and Canopus in Aboukir Bay, Egypt, discovered by Franck Goddio.

She is a research associate at the Université libre de Bruxelles and the University of Cambridge.

== Selected publications ==
- A. Masson, ‘Cult and Trade. A reflexion on Egyptian metal offerings from Naukratis’, in D. Robinson and F. Goddio (eds), Thonis Heracleion in context: The maritime economy of the Egyptian Late Period, Proceedings of the conference in the University of Oxford, 15–17 March 2013, Oxford (2015), 71–88.
- A. Masson, ‘Interpréter le matériel grec et chypriote dans un contexte religieux et thébain: l’exemple du quartier des prêtres de Karnak – des consommateurs égyptiens de produits grecs et chypriotes’, in G. Gorre and A. Marangou (eds), La présence grecque dans la vallée de Thèbes, Rennes (2015), 25–43.
- A. Masson, ‘Toward a New Interpretation of the Fire at North-Karnak? A Study of the Ceramic from the Building NKF35’, Cahiers de Karnak XV (2015), pp. 189–213.
- A. Masson, ‘Offering Magazines on the Southern Bank of the Sacred Lake in Karnak: The Oriental Complex of the Twenty-Fifth–Twenty-Sixth Dynasty’, E. Pischikova, J. Budka and K. Griffin (eds.), Thebes in the First Millennium BC, Cambridge (2014), pp. 587–602.
- A. Masson, ‘Domestic and Cultic Vessels from the Quarter of Priests in Karnak: The Fine Line between the Profane and the Sacred’, in B. Bader, M. Ownby (ed.), Functional Aspects of Egyptian Ceramics in their Archaeological Context, Orientalia Lovaniensia Analecta 217 (2013), pp. 141–164.
- A. Masson, ‘Persian and Ptolemaic ceramics from Karnak: change and continuity’, Cahier de la Céramique Égyptienne 9 (2011), pp. 269–310.
- M. Millet & A. Masson, ‘Karnak: Settlements’, in W. Wendrich, J. Dieleman, E. Frood, J. Baines (eds.), UCLA Encyclopedia of Egyptology (Los Angeles, 2011) http://escholarship.org/uc/item/1q346284
- A. Masson, ‘Jarres au décor polychrome du Musée Pouchkine: manifestations originales de la tendance archaïsante des 25e-26e dynasties?’, in D. Aston, B. Bader, C. Gallorini, P. Nicholson, S. Buckingham (eds.), Under the Potter's Tree - Studies on Ancient Egypt Presented to Janine Bourriau on the Occasion of her 70th Birthday, Orientalia Lovaniensia Analecta 204 (2011), pp. 645–677.
- A. Masson, ‘Un nouvel habitant de la rive est du lac Sacré à Karnak: le prophète du pieu sacré Pa sheri-n-aset’, Cahiers de Karnak XIII (2010), pp. 345–357.
- A. Masson, ‘Le quartier des prêtres du temple de Karnak: rapport préliminaire de la fouille de la maison VII, 2001-2003’, Cahiers de Karnak XII (2007), pp. 593–655.
- A. Masson & M. Millet, ‘Sondage sur le parvis du IVe pylône’, Cahiers de Karnak XII (2007), pp. 659–679.
