= Oxford Centre for Maritime Archaeology =

English research group

The Oxford Centre for Maritime Archaeology (OCMA) is a specialist research group within the School of Archaeology at the University of Oxford in England.

== Overview ==
Established in 2003 with the ongoing support of the Hilti Foundation, the OCMA is devoted to the study of people who live or work on and around water. The centre offers undergraduate and postgraduate courses in maritime archaeology and fosters research that ranges from the Mediterranean and its surrounding seas and oceans to the maritime cultures and peoples of the Indian Ocean and South China Sea from antiquity to the early modern period. In Egypt, the OCMA collaborates on field projects implemented by the Institut Européen d’Archéologie Sous-Marine (IEASM), under the direction of Franck Goddio. In 2011, OCMA began the excavation of shipwreck 43 in Aboukir Bay and the centre is also involved in work in Libya. Its research is disseminated through a vigorous programme of international conferences and in-house monograph publication.

== Teaching and research ==
The Oxford Centre for Maritime Archaeology offers post-graduate courses in maritime archaeology and provides post-graduate supervision within the School of Archaeology and the Faculty of Classics. The Hilti Foundation funds two postgraduate studentships into research relating to IEASM excavations in ancient Heracleion. Post-graduates research includes the Byzantine harbours in Greece and Spain, and the maritime archaeology of the Philippines, Korea and Cambodia. An option in Mediterranean maritime archaeology is also available to undergraduates.

== Excavation ==
The Oxford Centre for Maritime Archaeology is actively engaged in fieldwork as part of its on-going research strategy.

=== Shipwreck 43, Aboukir Bay ===
From 21&, OCMA is excavating shipwreck 43, one of 67 ancient ships so-far recorded by IEASM under Franck Goddio. Tentatively dated to between 785-481 cal BC, the vessel has a distinctive form of naval architecture that has not been fully documented elsewhere in the ancient Mediterranean. This involved the use of long tenons that were initially fitted into mortice holes that passed through the keel plank over which multiple lines of planking were added, pegged into place with wooden treenails. From the albeit limited excavations, there do not appear to be any frames and consequently the long tenons may have provided the structural stability of the vessel through a kind of ‘internal framework’. As the structural elements of the wreck were made from the locally available wood Acacia Totilis/Radiana, the team believes that shipwreck 43. was Egyptian in origin and thus probably involves a shipbuilding tradition that developed in accordance with the availability of local supplies of timber and the realities of nautical life at the margins of the Nile Delta 2015.

=== The Western Marmarica Coastal Survey ===
The OCMA supports the Western Marmarica Coastal Survey (WMCS) to investigate the engagement of the Roman and Byzantine countryside with coastal trade in eastern Libya. The region east of Tobruk was populated by small farms and villages, most of whom exported their produce in amphora made in their own kilns. Although the area lacked the environmental resources to develop into a major centre, it is not isolated. A range of archaeological finds suggest connections, at different times, to Cyrenaica, ca. 250 km west and to the Egyptian delta, some 600 km to the east, as well as contacts across the eastern Mediterranean to the Aegean, and through the Sahara to west Africa or the Sudan.

== Conferences and publication ==
The Oxford Centre for Maritime Archaeology publishes a monograph series as part of the Institute of Archaeology’s publication programme. Each volume is assessed by an internal review committee comprising principal members of staff from the Institute of Archaeology, the Oriental Institute, the Classics Centre and the Ashmolean Museum, and are also peer-reviewed.

The OCMA oversees the scholarly publication of the fieldwork conducted by the IEASM in Alexandria and the submerged Canopic region, as well as post-excavation studies of the material culture recovered from these excavations by IEASM specialists and Hilti Foundation sponsored post-graduate students. The OCMA regularly organizes conferences exploring themes within maritime archaeology or relating to the fieldwork of the IEASM. Volumes arising out of these conferences are also included in the monograph series.

=== Publications ===
OCMA publishes excavation monographs studies of ship and conference proceedings. The monographs are distributed by Casemate-Oxbow

=== Conferences ===
The Oxford Centre for Maritime Archaeology regularly organises conferences exploring themes within maritime archaeology or relating to the fieldwork of the Centre and of the IEASM.

== Staff ==
- Director: Damian Robinson
- Visiting professor: Franck Goddio
- Research officer: Linda Hulin
