= Abu Qir Fertilizers and Chemicals Industries Company =

Egyptian nitrogen fertilizer manufacturer

- Native name: شركة أبوقير للأسمدة
- Romanized name: Abu Qir Fertilizers Company
- Industry: Chemical
- Founded: July 20, 1976; 50 years ago in Egypt
- Headquarters: Abu Qir, Alexandria Governorate, Egypt
- Key people: Abed Ezz El-Regal (Chairman and CEO)
- Products: Nitrogen fertilizers; Chemical products
- Production output: 2.2 million tons (2022)
- Revenue: US$528 million (2023)
- Net income: US$293 million (2023)
- Total assets: US$723 million (2023)
- Total equity: US$2 billion (2023)
- Owner: Abu Dhabi Developmental Holding Company (21.5%); Saudi Egyptian Investment Company (19.8%); Egyptian General Petroleum Corporation (19.1%)
- Website: Official website

Abu Qir Fertilizers and Chemical Industries Co SAE (ABUK.CA) is an Egyptian chemicals manufacturer. It is one of the largest producers of nitrogen fertilizers in Egypt and the Middle East, responsible for about 50% of Egypt's nitrogen fertilizer production. It owns three plants that produce liquid fertiliser, ammonia, urea, and ammonium nitrate.

== Overview ==
The company and the 1st Ammonia Urea plant were established in 1976. The plant is located at Abu Qir Bay, 20 kilometers east of Alexandria. Originally established as a public-sector company, Abu Qir was first listed on the Egyptian Stock Exchange in 1994 and part-privatized in 2023, resulting in the company being listed as number 12 in Forbes' Top 50 Listed Companies in Egypt 2023. The following year, further stock sale reduced the government holding in the company from a controlling share to an influential minority.
