= French ship Adélaïde (1699) =

History

France
- Builder: Toulon Dockyard
- Laid down: December 1697
- Launched: 10 January 1699
- Fate: Wrecked 10 October 1714

General characteristics (Note: Linear measurements are in French feet, not English. Tons are French tons, not English.)
- Class & type: Fourth rate
- Tons burthen: 400 ("of load") (bm)
- Length: Overall: 115 feet total; Keel: 90 feet
- Beam: 30 feet 6 inches
- Draft: 12 feet 5 inches
- Complement: 6 officers + 200 other ranks
- Armament: 1699:20 × 12-pounder + 20 × 6–pounder + 4 × 4-pounder guns; 1704–1712:18 × 12-pounder + 18 × 6–pounder guns; 1714:30 guns

Adélaïde (or La Delaide) was a fourth-rate ship-of-the-line of the navy of Louis XIV, designed by François Couomb and launched in 1699 by the Toulon Dockyard. Between 1708 and 1714 she was chartered to several mercantile companies. She sank during a hurricane in October 1714 after having carried enslaved people from West Africa to Saint-Domingue.

== Career ==
Adélaïde was launched on 10 January 1699. Between January and May 1700 she was laid up at Toulon. She was fitted for sea duty between June and December. A report in 1702 stated that Adelaide sailed well.

In July 1707 Adelaide was among the many French naval vessels sunk at Toulon to protect them from British shell fire during the siege of Toulon. She was refloated in November.

Between 1708 and 1709 the Compagnie de Cap Nègre chartered Adelaide to carry wheat, after the severe winter of 1708 caused widespread famine in France and Spain during the War of Spanish Succession. The Compagnie got into financial difficulties in 1709. It had to sell its headquarters building and may have gone bankrupt.

In 1711 the Compagnie des Indies employed Adélaïde. She served in a small squadron under the command of Captain Roquemadure. She was laid up in 1712 at Port-Louis, Morbihan. On 11 March 1713 she was assessed as being fit for sea duty, and was fitted out. The Compagnie de l'Assiento chartered Adélaïde for the slave trade. (Note: The Compagnie de l'Assiento had been founded in 1701 and held the "assiento", a monopoly on the provision of slaves to Spanish colonies. The Treaty of Utrecht (1813) ended the war of the Spanish Succession, and one of its provisions transferred the assiento to Great Britain.)

=== Transporting enslaved people ===
Adélaïde, under the command of Captain de Champmoreau (or de Champmorant, or M. Champmorot) sailed from Lorient and started acquiring captives in Africa on 1 February 1714. She acquired the captives first at Whydah, and then at the port of Jacquin. (Note: Jacquin was a port belonging to the Kingdom of Allada. The Kingdom of Dahomey conquered Jacquin in 1724.) Adélaïde arrived at Léogâne, Saint-Domingue with 300 captives, who were sold there.

== Loss ==
Adélaïde sailed from Saint-Domingue on 1 October 1714, bound for Havana. A cyclone caught her on 10 October at Cape Corrientes, wrecking her. By one account there were 45 survivors from her crew of 151 men; by another account, she had left France with 130 men and had suffered 78 crew deaths on her voyage. French records attribute all 78 deaths to her wrecking.

== Post script ==
The underwater archaeologist Franck Goddio discovered Adélaïde's remains in 2003.

== Bibliography ==
- Demerliac, Alain (1995). La Marine de Louis XIV: Nomenclature des Navires Français de 1661 à 1715 (in French). Éditions Ancre.
- Roche, Jean-Michel (2005). Dictionnaire des bâtiments de la flotte de guerre française de Colbert à nos jours. Vol. 1. Group Retozel-Maury Millau. ISBN 978-2-9525917-0-6. OCLC 165892922.
