= Canopus (mythology) =

Helmsman of Menelaus in Greek mythology

Statuette of Osiris-Canopus with vase-shaped body, bronze, between 332 BC and 395 (Hellenistic/Roman Egypt). Museo Egizio, Turin.

In Greek mythology, Canopus (/kəˈnoʊpəs/) or Canobus from (Ancient Greek: Κάνωβος) was the pilot of the ship of King Menelaus of Sparta during the Trojan War.

== Mythology ==
Canopus is described as a handsome young man who was loved by an Egyptian prophetess, Theonoe, but never reciprocated her feelings.

According to legend, while visiting the Egyptian coast, Canopus was bitten by a serpent and died. His master, Menelaus, erected a monument to him at one of the mouths of the River Nile, around which the town of Canopus later developed.

== Legacy ==
Also named for Canopus is Canopus, the brightest star in the southern constellation of Carina (the keel of the ship Argo), and the second-brightest star in the night sky, after Sirius.

The last de Havilland Comet jet airliner ever flown was named Canopus. After retirement, it was kept at Bruntingthorpe Aerodrome in England.

The city of Canopus in Egypt was named after Canopus, who was said to have died there.

The Lindos Chronicle describes a dedication attributed to Kanopos, who supposedly dedicated his steering oars to Athena and Poseidon. The temple to Athena at Lindos contained many dedications associated with legendary heroes.
