= HMS Aboukir =

Four ships of the Royal Navy have borne the name HMS Aboukir, after Abu Qir Bay, the site of the Battle of the Nile:

- HMS Aboukir (1798) was a 74-gun third-rate ship of the line, formerly the French ship Aquilon captured at the Battle of the Nile in 1798 and broken up in 1802.
- HMS Aboukir (1807) was a 74-gun third-rate ship of the line launched in 1807, on harbour service from 1824 and sold in 1838.
- HMS Aboukir (1848) was a 90-gun second-rate ship of the line launched in 1848. She was refitted with screw propulsion in 1858 and was sold in 1877.
- HMS Aboukir (1900) was a Cressy-class cruiser launched in 1900 and torpedoed along with two sister ships on 22 September 1914.

== See also ==
- SS Abukir, a British coaster built in 1920 and sunk while rescuing evacuees from the battle of Belgium in May 1940
