= Abu Qir =

Abu Qir ابو قير
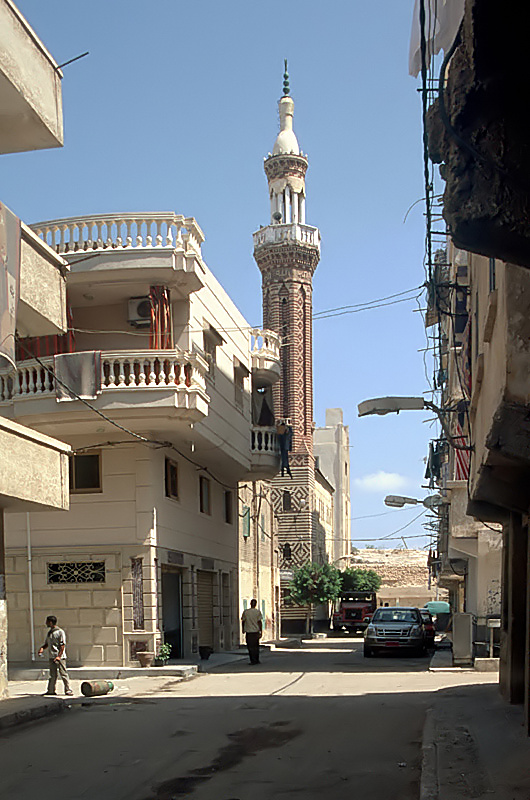
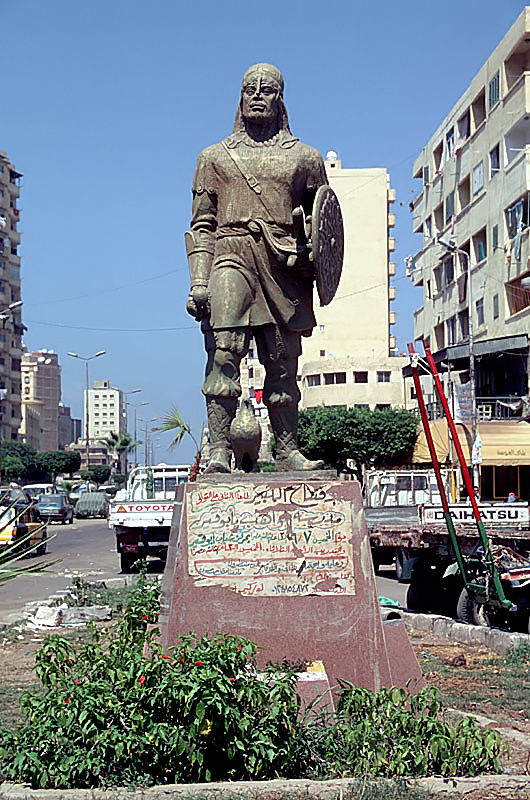
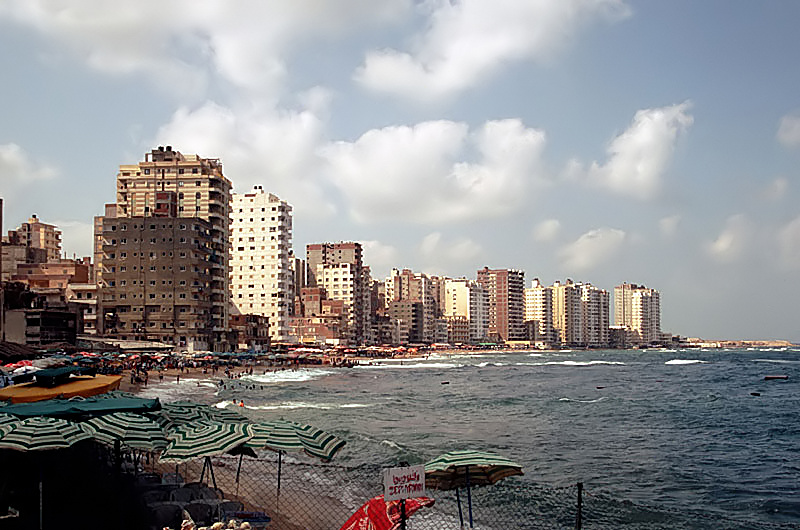
- Top left: 10th of Ramadan Mosque; Top right: memorial statue of a muslim warrior Bottom: beach at the north of the town

- Location in Egypt
- Coordinates: 31°19′N 30°04′E
- Country: Egypt
- Governorate: Alexandria Governorate

Population (2006)
  - Total: 37,997
- Time zone: UTC+2 (EET)
  - Summer (DST): UTC+3 (EEST)

Abu Qir (Arabic: ابو قير, romanized: Abu Qīr, [æbuˈ] or [æbo ʔiːɾ]; Coptic: ⲁⲡⲁⲕⲩⲣⲓ Apakyri), formerly also spelled Abukir or Aboukir, is a town on the Mediterranean coast of Egypt, near the ruins of ancient Canopus and 23 kilometers (14 mi) northeast of Alexandria by rail. It is located on Abu Qir Peninsula, with Abu Qir Bay to the east.

== Name ==
The town's present name is Arabic for "Father Cyrus", one of a pair of fourth century Christian martyrs venerated as Saints Cyrus and John by the Coptic Church.

== History ==
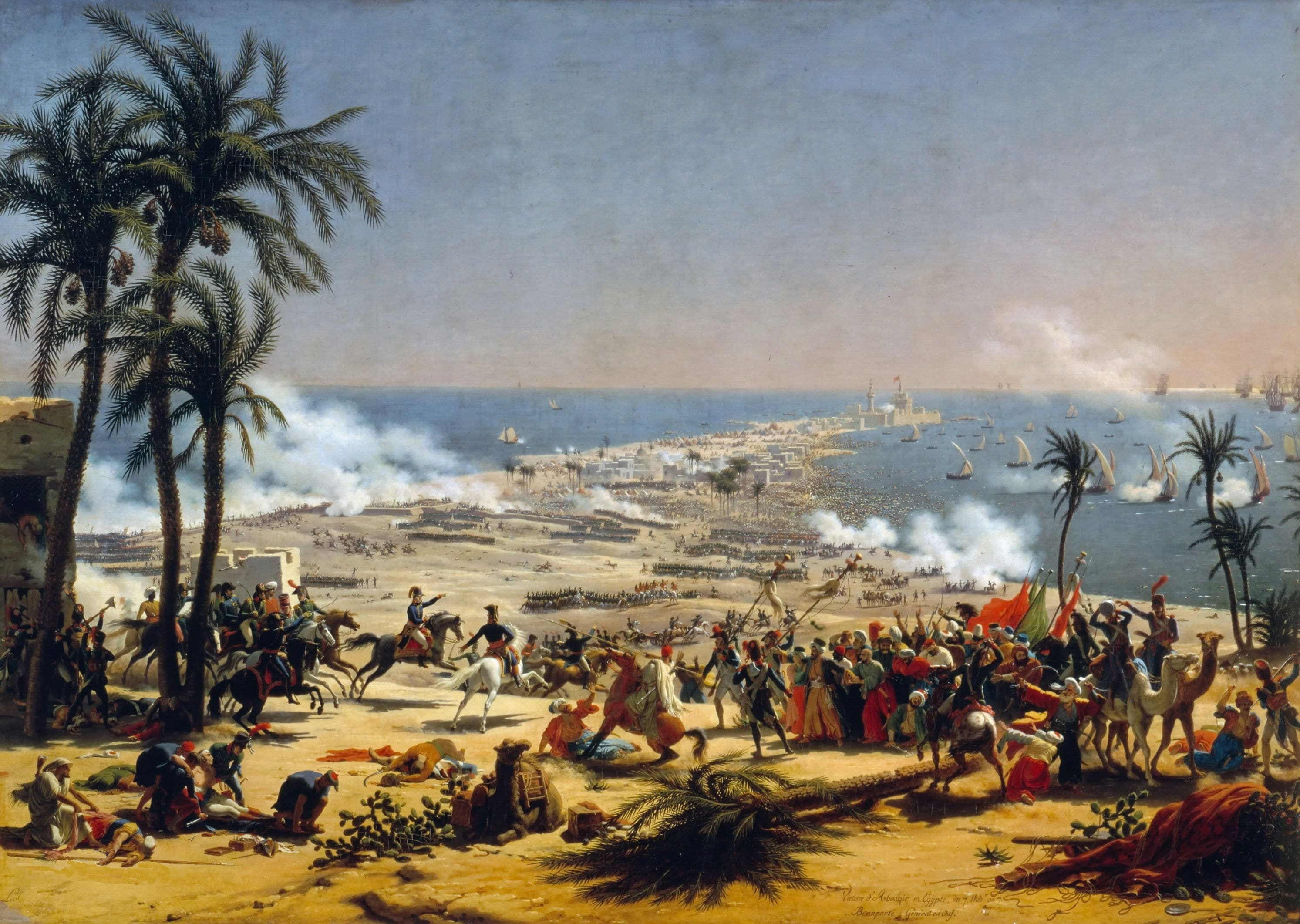
The Battle of Aboukir by Louis-François Lejeune

The remains of many ancient buildings from the Egyptian, Greek and Roman periods can be found near the town. About 3 kilometers (2 mi) southeast of the town are the ruins of the Ancient Egyptian coastal town of Canopus. A little farther east, the now-dry Canopic branch of the Nile once entered the Mediterranean.

The wide Abu Qir Bay (Khalīj Abū Qīr) stretches eastward from the town as far as the Rosetta mouth of the Nile. On 1 August 1798 the bay was the location of the Battle of the Nile, fought by the British Admiral Horatio Nelson. The battle is often referred to as the "Battle of Aboukir Bay", though this title is more properly applied to Battle of Abukir of 1799, an engagement between the French expeditionary army and the Turks under Mustapha Pasha fought on 25 July the following year. Later in the war, on 8 March 1801 at the beginning of the Battle of Alexandria, units of the British army commanded by Sir Ralph Abercromby landed from their transports near the town, and faced strenuous opposition from General Louis Friant's French forces entrenched on the beach. The battle continued further down the peninsula toward Alexandria and did not end until 22 March.

The town contains a castle that was used as a state prison by Muhammad Ali in the early 19th century. The prison was known as Liman Abu Qir.

In 2000, an Italian archaeological team discovered the remains of British officers, sailors, marines, women, and children on Nelson's Island, which lies in the bay.

== Climate ==
Köppen-Geiger climate classification system classifies its climate as hot desert (BWh), but it lies at the northern coast of Egypt, moderating its temperatures. Due to its proximity to Alexandria, it has a very similar climate. The wettest places in Egypt are Rafah, Alexandria, Abu Qir, Rosetta, Baltim, Kafr El Dawwar, Mersa Matruh.

Climate data for Abu Qir
| Month | Jan | Feb | Mar | Apr | May | Jun | Jul | Aug | Sep | Oct | Nov | Dec | Year |
|---|---|---|---|---|---|---|---|---|---|---|---|---|---|
| Mean daily maximum °C (°F) | 17.8 (64.0) | 18.4 (65.1) | 20.6 (69.1) | 23.5 (74.3) | 26.6 (79.9) | 29 (84) | 29.7 (85.5) | 30.6 (87.1) | 29.7 (85.5) | 28.2 (82.8) | 24.5 (76.1) | 20.1 (68.2) | 24.9 (76.8) |
| Daily mean °C (°F) | 13.7 (56.7) | 14.3 (57.7) | 16 (61) | 18.5 (65.3) | 21.6 (70.9) | 24.6 (76.3) | 25.9 (78.6) | 26.5 (79.7) | 25.5 (77.9) | 23.5 (74.3) | 20 (68) | 15.9 (60.6) | 20.5 (68.9) |
| Mean daily minimum °C (°F) | 9.7 (49.5) | 10.2 (50.4) | 11.4 (52.5) | 13.6 (56.5) | 16.7 (62.1) | 20.3 (68.5) | 22.1 (71.8) | 22.5 (72.5) | 21.4 (70.5) | 18.9 (66.0) | 15.6 (60.1) | 11.7 (53.1) | 16.2 (61.1) |
| Average precipitation mm (inches) | 52 (2.0) | 31 (1.2) | 9 (0.4) | 2 (0.1) | 2 (0.1) | 0 (0) | 0 (0) | 0 (0) | 0 (0) | 7 (0.3) | 28 (1.1) | 52 (2.0) | 183 (7.2) |
Source: Climate-Data.org

== See also ==
- History of Christianity in Egypt
- HMS Aboukir
- RAF Aboukir
- Lake Mariout
