= Menouthis =

Sacred city in Ancient Egypt

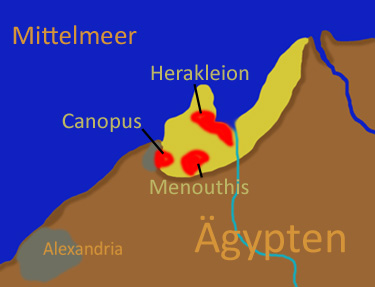
- Map of Nile Delta showing ancient Canopus, Heracleion, and Menouthis
- Country: Egypt

Menouthis was a sacred city in ancient Egypt, devoted to the Egyptian goddess Isis and god Serapis. The city was probably submerged under the sea as a result of catastrophic natural causes, including earthquakes or a flooding of the Nile. Land in the bay area was subject to rising sea levels, earthquakes, and tsunamis, parts of it apparently becoming submerged after a process of soil liquefaction sometime at the end of the 2nd century BC.

== Name ==
The city's name most probably comes from Isis's epithet mwt-nTr, "Mother of God" (Horus).

== Religious significance ==
In Roman Egypt, Menouthis was widely known as an oracular and healing cult centre of the Ancient Egyptian goddess Isis and it drew devotees from a wide region. The temple of Isis in the city contained religious statues and was decorated with hieroglyphs. In 391 AD the city's Serapeum was demolished during the persecution of pagans in the late Roman Empire, and in the following year the temple of Isis was closed and partially dismantled, with Christian Tabennesiote monks taking over the temple's country estates. In 413 AD, at a site opposite the temple, Pope Theophilus of Alexandria built a Christian shrine dedicated to the Four Evangelists. The shrine became home to the bones of the saints Cyrus and John, which were moved there from Alexandria by Cyril of Alexandria..

During the 5th century the Isis temple continued to be used for sacrifices and incubation rites.. The temple remained in use alongside the Christian shrine and the worship of Egyptian gods and their statues continued in the city. However, as time went by the traditional healing function of the temple was transferred to the Christian shrine.

In 414, there was a temple at Menouthis famed for its oracles, which attracted even some simple Christians. St. Cyril thought to replace this cult by establishing a shrine to St. Cyrus the Unmercenary Healer. As Cyril explained in a homily, he had a vision in which an angel instructed him to bring the relics of St Cyrus to Menouthis in order to do battle with Isis. When the floor of St Mark’s church in Canopus, where St. Cyr was buried with his companion St. John the Unmercenary, was opened, two graves were found. Both bodies were brought to Menouthis, an event commemorated in the Byzantine Churches on June 28. St Cyril said, “The holy martyrs, Ss. Cyrus and John, came forth ready to do battle for the Christian religion… As their reward for their love for Christ, they received the power to trample upon Satan and expel the force of evil spirits” (Homily 18, 3). St Cyril thought it would be futile to forbid Christians to visit “the Mistress,” as Isis was known. However, he asked that Christians first visit the relics of Ss. Cyrus and John. This caused the priests of Isis to refuse them entry to her shrine, bringing its popularity to an end. Entrusted to the care of the Pachomian monastery of Tabennisi, the shrine became known throughout the Middle East and beyond for the healings reported there. This increased the fame of the saints and the city eventually became known as Aba-Kyr (Father Cyrus). Perhaps the most famous healing attributed to these saints was that of St. Sophronios of Jerusalem, who had a disease of the eyes which often led to total blindness, and was cured. In gratitude, he composed what in English is generally called The Seventy Miracles of Ss. Cyrus and John, and which contains a number of miracles attributed to St. Cyrus and St. John. In 634, Sophronios sent a copy of his Miracles along with some relics of Ss. Cyrus and John to the pope of Rome. The temple was demolished in 484 AD and the statues of the classical gods in the city were removed or destroyed in 488–89 AD. By the end of the 5th century the Christian shrine had replaced the temple as a healing centre. At the height of its popularity in the 6th and 7th centuries the shrine was one of the two principal pilgrimage centres of Christian Egypt.

== In popular culture ==
"Menouthis" is also the name of a song by E. S. Posthumus, inspired by the ancient city.

== See also ==
- List of ancient Egyptian towns and cities

== Sources ==
- Frankfurter, David, ed. (1998). Pilgrimage and Holy Space in Late Antique Egypt. BRILL. ISBN 9789004111271.
- McKenzie, Judith (2007). The Architecture of Alexandria and Egypt, C. 300 B.C. to A.D. 700. The Pelican History of Art. Vol. 63. Yale University Press. ISBN 9780300115550.
- Neil, Bronwen (2016). "The Miracles of Saints Cyrus and John: The Greek text and its Transmission" (PDF). Journal of the Australian Early Medieval Association. 2: 183–193.
- Trombley, Frank R. (1995). Hellenic Religion and Christianization c. 370-529. Religions in the Graeco-Roman World. Vol. 2. Brill. ISBN 9789004276789.
- "Holy Martyrs Cyrus and John (January 31)". Melkite Catholic Eparchy of Newton.
