= Institut Européen d'Archéologie Sous-Marine =

The Institut Européen d’archéologie Sous-Marine (IEASM) (English: European Institute for Underwater Archaeology) was founded in 1987 as a French non-profit organisation by President Franck Goddio. The organisation locates, explores, excavates and restores sunken sites. Further, the Instituto Europeo de Arqueologia Submarina was founded in April 2019 in Madrid, Spain.

== The Institute ==
The European Institute of Underwater Archaeology (IEASM) works in close collaboration with the authorities of the countries in which it excavates and under their control. It calls on specialists in the fields of archaeology, history, conservation, restoration, geophysics, geology in its research, to study and publish its findings. The activities of IEASM have been mainly supported by the Hilti Foundation since 1996.

After restoration and conservation, the objects recovered by IEASM enrich the permanent collections of the regional and national museums in the countries in which they were discovered or, have been donated to institutions in third countries such as the Museo Naval in Madrid, the Musée national des arts asiatiques - Guimet in Paris or the Musée national de la Marine in Port-Louis (Morbihan). Further, IEASM has created travelling exhibitions allowing the general public to enjoy its discoveries.

=== Excavations ===
Prior to any archaeological excavation, IEASM carries out state-of-the-art geophysical surveys, which id then verified during excavation. This approach has led to several significant and historically important discoveries such as the display of the antic harbour of Alexandria or the city of Thonis-Heracleion.

=== Conservation ===
The excavations benefit from a conservation-restoration unit on board the mission support boat, allowing the initial stages of object conservation to be carried out on site. Additional treatments, requiring heavier equipment, take place in local laboratories in collaboration with the institutions concerned.

=== Studies ===
IEASM brings together a range of scientists and subject specialists to work on the excavations and to study the material uncovered. The studies are carried out by scientists participating in the excavations or entrusted to specialists. In 2003 the Oxford Centre for Maritime Archaeology (OCMA) was established in the School of Archaeology at the University of Oxford, and IEASM has made it possible for doctoral students there to study the archaeological material uncovered during its missions.

=== Publications ===
As part of their partnership, the Oxford Centre for Maritime Archaeology (OCMA) is responsible for the academic publications of the results of IEASM's missions as well as studies of the excavated material carried out by doctoral students and subject specialists working for IEASM.

=== Education ===
OCMA's mission is also to teach maritime archaeology at an undergraduate and graduate level and to organise conferences in maritime archaeology. To date, several doctoral students have obtained PhDs based on material from IEASM excavations.

=== Outreach ===
The sustainability of the discoveries also depends on the dissemination of the results to the general public. The Institute and its partners are therefore involved in the publication of articles, general interest books, exhibitions such as The Treasure of San Diego" (1994–1998), "Sunken Treasures of Egypt" (2006–2009), "Cleopatra, the Search for the Last Queen of Egypt" (2010–2012), and "Osiris, Sunken Mysteries of Egypt" (2015–2021) and are participating in documentaries.
