= Canopus, Egypt =

Ancient Egyptian town

Coordinates: 31°18′N 30°5′E

Canopus
- ⲕⲁⲛⲱⲡⲟⲥ (Coptic)
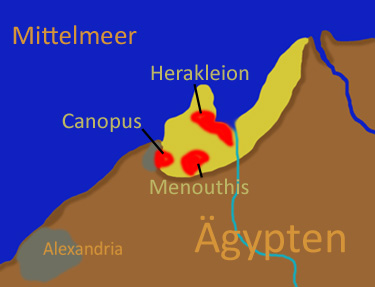

- Location within Egypt
- Location: Alexandria Governorate, Egypt
- Region: Lower Egypt

Canopus (Arabic: كانوب Kanubu, Coptic: Ⲕⲁⲛⲱⲡⲟⲥ, Kanopos; Ancient Greek: Κάνωπος, Kanōpos), also known as Canobus (Ancient Greek: Κάνωβος, Kanōbos), was an ancient Egyptian coastal town, located in the Nile Delta. Its site is in the eastern outskirts of modern-day Alexandria, around 25 kilometers (16 mi) from the center of that city. Canopus was located on the western bank at the mouth of the westernmost branch of the Delta – known as the Canopic or Heracleotic branch. It belonged to the seventh Egyptian Nome, known as Menelaites, and later as Canopites, after it. It was the principal port in Egypt for Greek trade before the foundation of Alexandria, along with Naucratis and Heracleion. Its ruins lie near the present Egyptian town of Abu Qir.

Land in the area of Canopus was subject to rising sea levels, earthquakes, tsunamis, and large parts of it seem to have succumbed to liquefaction sometime at the end of the 2nd century BC. The eastern suburbs of Canopus collapsed, their remains being today submerged in the sea, with the western suburbs being buried beneath the modern coastal city of Abu Qir.

== Name ==
p g wA ti t niwt
pgwꜣt — Canopus
(Decree of Canopus)
in hieroglyphs
Era: Ptolemaic dynasty
(305–30 BC)

p n g wA ti i Z1 t niwt
pngwꜣt — Canopus
(Decree of Canopus)
in hieroglyphs
Era: Ptolemaic dynasty
(305–30 BC)

p r g wA ti i Z1 t niwt
prgwꜣt — Canopus
(Decree of Canopus)
in hieroglyphs
Era: Ptolemaic dynasty
(305–30 BC)

g nw pt niwt
Genp — Canopus
in hieroglyphs
Era: Ptolemaic dynasty
(305–30 BC)

g A W t y niwt
gꜣwtj — Canopus
in hieroglyphs
Era: Ptolemaic dynasty
(305–30 BC)

The settlement's Egyptian name was written in Demotic as (pr-gwṱ, sometimes romanized Peguat or Pikuat). The Greeks called it Canopus (Κάνωπος, Kánōpos) after a legendary commander of the era of the Trojan War supposedly buried there. The English form of the name derives from the Latinized form used under Roman rule.

== History ==
=== Ancient Egypt ===
Canopus was the site of a temple to the Egyptian god Serapis.

The name of Canopus appears in the first half of the 6th century BC in a poem by Solon. Early Egyptological excavations some 2 or 3 km from the area known today as Abu Qir have revealed extensive traces of the city with its quays, and granite monuments with the name of Ramesses II, but they may have been brought in for the adornment of the place at a later date. The exact date of the foundation of Canopus is unknown, but Herodotus refers to it as an ancient port. Homeric myth claims that it was founded by Menelaus, and named after Canopus, the pilot of his ship, who died there after being bitten by a serpent. (Note: The first reference to Canopus as the helmsman of Menelaus seems to be by Hecataeus of Miletus.) Legend describes how Menelaus built a monument to his memory on the shore, around which the town later grew up. There is unlikely to be any connection with "canopy". A temple to Osiris was built by king Ptolemy III Euergetes, but according to Herodotus, very near to Canopus was an older shrine, (Note: This may have been a reference to the newly discovered Heracleion.) a temple of Heracles that served as an asylum for fugitive slaves. Osiris was worshipped at Canopus under a peculiar form: that of a vase with a human head. Through an old misunderstanding, the name "canopic jars" was applied by early Egyptologists to the vases with human and animal heads in which the internal organs were placed by the Egyptians after embalming.

The ancient city of Canopus is attested to, in part, by the Decree of Canopus. The decree mentions the temple of Canopus and an important rite in which, once a year, [an effigy of] Osiris is transported from Heracleium to Canopus. Specifically, the decree says, "...to consecrate the same goddess like Osiris, in the temple of Canopus,...we shall draw along Osiris during the drawing along of the barge to the same temple, at the season of the year, from the temple which is in Heracleium, on the twenty-ninth of the month of Choac".

=== Hellenistic period ===
In Ptolemy III Euergetes' ninth regnal year (239 BC), a great assembly of priests at Canopus passed an honorific decree (the "Decree of Canopus") that, inter alia, conferred various new titles on the king and his consort, Berenice. Three examples of this decree are now known (plus some fragments), inscribed in Egyptian (in both hieroglyphic and demotic) and in classical Greek, and they were second only to the more famous Rosetta Stone in providing the key to deciphering the ancient Egyptian language. This was the earliest of the series of bilingual inscriptions of the "Rosetta Stone Series", also known as the Ptolemaic Decrees. There are three such Decrees altogether.

The town had a large trade in henna (a plant-based dye).

=== Roman period ===
In Roman times, the town was notorious for its dissoluteness. Seneca wrote of the luxury and vice of Canopus, though he also mentioned that "Canopus does not keep any man from living simply". Juvenal's Satire VI referred to the "debauchery" that prevailed there. The emperor Hadrian built a villa at Tivoli, 18 miles away from Rome, where he replicated for his enjoyment architectural patterns from all parts of the Roman Empire. One of these (and the most excavated and studied today) was borrowed from Canopus.

=== Modern town ===
The Egyptian town of Abu Qir ("Father Cyrus"), honoring two Christian martyrs, is located a few kilometres away from the ruins of Canopus. It is a town (around 1900 with 1000 inhabitants), at the end of a little peninsula north-east of Alexandria. It has a trade in quails, which are caught in nets hung along the shore. Off Aboukir on 1 August 1798, the French Mediterranean fleet was destroyed within the roads by British Admiral Horatio Nelson. On 25 July 1799, Napoleon Bonaparte destroyed there a Turkish army 18,000 strong; and on 8 March 1801, the French garrison of 1,800 men was defeated by 20,000 English and Ottoman Turks commanded by Abercromby.

== See of Canopus ==
Egypt had many martyrs in the Diocletianic Persecution, among others St. Athanasia with her three daughters, and St. Cyrus and John. There was here a monastery called Metanoia, founded by monks from Tabennisi, where many a patriarch of Alexandria took shelter during the religious quarrels of the 5th century. Three kilometres (2 mi) east of Canopus was the famous Pharaonic temple of Manouthin, afterwards destroyed by monks, and a church on the same spot dedicated to the Four Evangelists. St. Cyril of Alexandria solemnly transported the relics of the holy martyrs Cyrus and John into the church, which became an important place of pilgrimage. It was here that St. Sophronius of Jerusalem was healed of an ophthalmy that had been declared incurable by the physicians (610–619), whereupon he wrote the panegyric of the two saints with a compilation of seventy miracles worked in their sanctuary (Migne, Patrologia Graeca, LXXXVII, 3379–676) Canopus formed, with Menelaus and Schedia, a suffragan see subject to Alexandria in the Roman province of Aegyptus Prima; it is usually called Schedia in the Notitiae episcopatuum. Two titulars are mentioned by Lequien (II, 415), one in 325, the other in 362.

== Archaeology ==
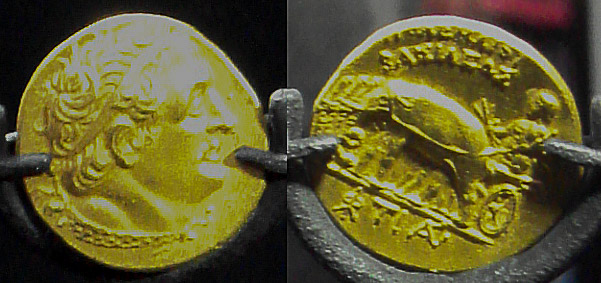
Ptolemaic coins from the submerged Heracleion

Over time the land around Canopus was weakened by a combination of earthquakes, tsunamis and rising sea levels. The eastern suburbs succumbed to liquefaction of the soil. The western suburbs eventually became the present day Egyptian coastal city of Abu Qir.

In 1933, a RAF commander who was flying over Abu Qir Bay thought he was seeing ruins in the bay and informed Egyptian scholar Prince Omar Toussoun who subsequently undertook archaeological investigations and with the help of fishermen found an archeological site 1,8 km from shore.

Since 1992, the IEASM led by French underwater archaeologist Franck Goddio has been surveying the Abu Qir Bay. The undersea ruins were eventually identified as the lost city of Canopus after excavations.

Underwater archaeology at the eastern portion of Canopus, 16 mi (26 km) northeast of Alexandria in Abu Qir Bay, has provided numerous important discoveries including the following:

- A portion of a human-sized sphinx
- The head of a four-to-five-meter-tall marble statue of the god Serapis
- A three-meter-wide, 103-meter-long masonry wall of a major building, almost certainly the Temple of Serapis, a Serapeum
- A nearly intact life-sized statue, in black granite, of a Ptolemaic queen, in a transitional Greek-Egyptian style
- Remains of the ancient ceremonial canal which linked Heracleium [Heracleion] and Canopus
- Offerings, in the form of small votive statues, which were tossed into the canal
- The nearly complete wooden remains of a ceremonial boat, or barge, in sycamore, a wood associated with the god Osiris. The canal and boat are believed to have been used to carry an effigy of Osiris in celebrating the sacred Mysteries of Osiris, a foundational ceremony for the ancient Egyptian religion.
- Parts of a nearly complete Naos of the Decades, an ancient Egyptian stone monument providing a guide to the heavens and a portion of the Egyptian creation myths
- An imperial-period Roman statue of Nilus, the Nile personified
- Pagan statues with damage done in 391 CE by order of the Christian Emperor Theodosius I, i.e., acts of iconoclasm
- Artifacts such as coins and jewelry from the site's Christian era
- Fractured Christian-era masonry structures providing evidence of a massive earthquake

== See also ==
- List of ancient Egyptian towns and cities
