= Franck Goddio =

French underwater archaeologist (born 1947)

Franck Goddio (born 1947) is a French underwater archaeologist who, in 2000, discovered the city of Thonis-Heracleion 7 km (4.3 mi) off the Egyptian shore in Aboukir Bay. He led the excavation of the submerged site of Canopus and of the ancient harbour of Alexandria (Portus Magnus), including Antirhodos Island. He has also excavated ships in the waters of the Philippines, significantly the Spanish galleon San Diego.

== Biography ==
Goddio was born in Casablanca, Morocco. He received degrees in mathematics and statistics from the École Nationale de la Statistique et de l'Administration Économique in Paris. He was employed as an advisor to national and international organizations and various governments for over 15 years.

In the early 1980s, he decided to focus on underwater archaeology. In 1987, he founded the Institut Européen d'Archéologie Sous-Marine (IEASM) in Paris.

In his work in detecting and recovering ancient shipwrecks and searching for the remains of sunken cities, Goddio developed a systematic approach to underwater archaeology. He has found or excavated over a dozen sunken ships of historic importance, which had been resting on the ocean bed for hundreds of years. Among them are junks dating from the 11th to the 15th centuries, the Spanish galleon San Diego and San José (1694), Napoleon Bonaparte's flagship Orient and two East Indiamen: Griffin (1761) and Royal Captain, lost in 1773.

Goddio adheres to strict archaeological standards during the exploration and excavation phases, and closely cooperates with national and local authorities, leading archaeological experts and institutions. In 2003, in co-operation with Oxford University, he helped to found the Oxford Centre for Maritime Archaeology (OCMA). In 2009, he was appointed a senior visiting lecturer in the School of Archaeology at Oxford University. In the same year, he received the French Legion of Honour (Légion d'Honneur). In 2018, he became visiting professor in maritime archaeology at Oxford University.

Goddio's research projects have been financed by the Hilti Foundation since 1996. He has written several books and scientific articles, reporting on research projects and excavations. Several TV documentaries have also been produced and aired throughout the world. In addition, various exhibitions have presented the finds and made them accessible to a wide audience. The discovery of a cup inscribed with a reference (in Greek) to "Christ", dating from the 2nd century CE, received international publicity.

== Expeditions ==
- 1986–1988: Griffin (1761) of the British East India Company
- 1987–1990: Spanish galleon San José (1694)
- 1990–1994: Spanish galleon San Diego (1600)
- 1996–2003: sunken royal quarters of Alexandria's eastern harbour, Egypt
- 1997: Royal Captain of the British East India Company
- 1997: junk of the Lena shoal with ceramics of the Ming dynasty
- 1998–1999: Napoleon's lost fleet from the battle against Admiral Nelson in Aboukir Bay in 1798 and his flagship Orient
- 2000–2003: the sunken cities of Thônis–Heracleion and Canopus in Aboukir Bay, Egypt
- 2002: junk Santa Cruz with over 10,000 pieces of 15th-century porcelain
- 2003: French slave ship Adélaïde, lost in 1714 off the coast of Cuba
- 2004–present: researches and excavations of Egypt's coast in the Bay of Aboukir on the sites of Canopus and Thonis-Heracleion, finalisation of the topography of the sites, continuing excavation in Alexandria's Eastern Harbour

== Exhibitions (selection) ==
Objects found during excavations directed by Goddio have enriched the national collection of countries where the excavations took place: the National Museum of the Philippines, the Grand Egyptian Museum (GEM) in Giza, the Museum of the Bibliotheca Alexandrina, the Graeco-Roman Museum of Alexandria and the National Museum of Alexandria. In accordance with the antiquities authority in the Philippines, objects from Goddio's excavations were donated to the Museo Naval de Madrid, Guimet Museum (Musée des arts asiatiques-Guimet, France) and the Maritime Museum in Port Louis.

Goddio has also created travelling exhibitions to bring his discoveries to wide audiences:

Osiris. Egypt's Sunken Mysteries The exhibition presents artefacts drawn largely from the last seven years of underwater excavations at the ancient cities of Thonis-Heracleion and Canopus off the coast of Egypt by the European Institute for Underwater Archaeology (IEASM), directed by Franck Goddio in cooperation with the Egyptian Ministry for Antiquities and supported by the Hilti Foundation. The selection is supplemented by 40 artefacts from museums in Cairo and Alexandria. Displayed in Paris at the institut du monde arabe, Sept 2015 – March 2016; in London at the British Museum in a slightly different version under the title "Sunken cities. Egypt's lost worlds" May – November 2016, in Zurich at the Museum Rietberg, February – July 2017; in Saint Louis (MO, US) at the St Louis Arts Museum March–September 2018 and in Minneapolis (MN, US) at the Minneapolis Institute of Art, November 2018 – April 2019. In Los Angeles/Simi Valley at the Ronald Reagan Presidential Library and Museum, October 2019 - April 2020 and in Richmond at the Virginia Museum of Fine Arts, Richmond (VA), July 2020 - January 2021.

Egypt's Sunken Treasures: A selection of some 500 artefacts unearthed during the excavations in Aboukir Bay and the port of Alexandria. Presented in Berlin (April – September 2006), Paris (December 2006 – March 2007), Bonn (April 2007 – January 2008), Madrid (April – December 2008), Turin (February – May 2009) and Yokohama (June – September 2009).

Cleopatra, The Search for the Last Queen of Egypt A selection of 146 artefacts from Egypt's sunken treasures, displayed in the United States from 2010 to 2013, as part of the larger exhibition "Cleopatra, The Search for the Last Queen of Egypt" at the Franklin Institute in Philadelphia, at the Cincinnati Museum Center in Cincinnati, Ohio, at the Public Museum in Milwaukee, Wisconsin, and at the California Science Center in Los Angeles.

Treasures of the San Diego: An exhibition of the Spanish galleon, illustrating the work of the team: archivists, engineers, divers, archaeologists, scientists, illustrators, photographers and cameramen: Paris (September 1994 – January 1995), Madrid (May – October 1995), New York (November 1996 – February 1997), Berlin (June – Oct. 1997), Manille (February – April 1998).

== Bibliography (selection) ==
- Franck Goddio, The Iseum of the Royal Island of Antirhodos. Excavations in the Portus Magnus of Alexandria, Oxford Centre for Maritime Archaeology, University of Oxford 2025, ISBN 978-1-905905-51-5
- Franck Goddio and Damian Robinson (Eds.), Constructing, Remaking and Dismantling Sacred Landscapes in Lower Egypt from the Late Dynastic to the Early Medieval Period, Oxford Centre for Maritime Archaeology, University of Oxford 2021, ISBN 9781998994304
- Sylvie Cauville and Franck Goddio, De la Stèle du Satrape (ligne14-15) au temple de Kom Ombo, in Göttinger Miszellen, Beiträge zur ägyptologischen Diskussion (Helft 253/2017, N° 950), pp. 45–54.
- Franck Goddio and Aurélia Masson-Berghoff, Sunken cities, Egypt's lost worlds, Thames & Hudson in cooperation with the British Museum, 2016, ISBN 978-0-500-29237-2
- Franck Goddio and Damian Robinson (Eds.), Thonis-Heracleion in context, Oxford Centre for Maritime Archaeology, Oxford 2015, ISBN 978-1-9059-05331
- Franck Goddio and David Fabre, "Osiris, Egypt's sunken Mysteries", Paris 2015, ISBN 978-2-08137873-5
- Zahi Hawass and Franck Goddio, Cleopatra – The Search for the last Queen of Egypt, National Geographic, Washington D.C. 2010, ISBN 978-1-4262-0545-3
- Underwater Archaeology in the Canopic Region – The Topography and Excavation of Heracleion–Thonis and East Canopus (1996–2006), Oxford Centre for Maritime Archaeology, Oxford 2007, ISBN 978-0-9549627-3-9
- André Bernand and Franck Goddio, Sunken Egypt – Alexandria, Arcperiplus, London 2002, ISBN 1-902699-51-3
- Franck Goddio ed., Egypt's Sunken Treasures, Prestel, Munich 2006, ISBN 978-3-7913-3970-2
- Peter Lam, Rosemary Scott, Stacey Pierson, Monique Crick, and Franck Goddio, Lost at Sea, Periplus Publishing, London 2002, ISBN 1-902699-13-0
- Archaeological Survey of Alexandria's Eastern Harbour. In Underwater Archaeology and Coastal Management, Unesco Publishing 2000
- Gabrielle Iltis, Franck Goddio et al., Royal Captain, Periplus Publishing, London 2000, ISBN 1-902699-19-X
- Stacey Pierson, Monique Crick, and Franck Goddio, Sunken Treasures of the Lena Cargo, Periplus Publishing, London 2000, ISBN 1-902699-22-X
- Evelyne Jay Guyot de Saint Michel and Franck Goddio, Griffin – On the Route of an Indiaman, Periplus Publishing, London 1999, ISBN 1-902699-03-3
- André Bernard, Etienne Bernand, Jean Yoyotte, Franck Goddio et al., Alexandria, the Submerged Royal Quarters, Periplus Publishing, London 1998, ISBN 1-902699-00-9

== Documentaries ==
- Cleopatra's Last Temple, RMC Découverte, 2025
- The Lost City of Canopus/ Cleopatra's Lost City, Channel 5/ Smithsonian Channel, 2021
- Drain Egypt's Sunken City, National Geographic Channel US, May 2020
- Cleopatra's Palace – In Search Of A Legend, Discovery Channel, 1999
- Napoleon's Fleet, Discovery Channel, 1999
- Treasures Of The Royal Captain, Discovery Channel, 2000
- Sunken Cities, Ancient Earthquakes, Discovery Channel, 2001
- Lost Temple To The Gods, Discovery Channel, 2003
- Franck Goddio – In Search Of Sunken Treasures, Spiegel TV, 2006
- Treasures of The San Diego, Rundfunk Berlin-Brandenburg 2007
- Egypt's Sunken City – A Legend is Revealed, Arte/MDR, 2013
- Swallowed by the Sea: Ancient Egypt's Greatest Lost City, BBC, UK, 2014
- The Wonder List with Bill Weir, CNN October 2017
- Inside Africa, CNN International, June 2018
