= Heracleion =

Ancient Egyptian city

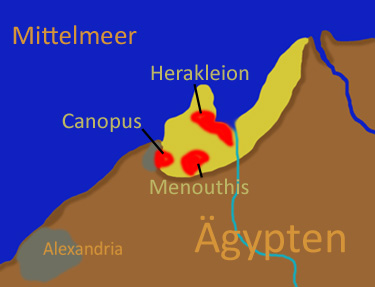
- Map of Nile Delta showing ancient Canopus, Heracleion, and Menouthis

- Location within Egypt
- 31°18′46″N 30°07′44″E
- Location: near Alexandria, Egypt

Heracleion (Ancient Greek: Ἡράκλειον Hērákleion), also known as Thonis (Ancient Greek: Θῶνις Thônis; from the Ancient Egyptian: Tȝ-ḥn.t; Coptic: Ⲧϩⲱⲛⲓ Thōni) and sometimes called Thonis-Heracleion, was an ancient Egyptian port city located near the Canopic Mouth of the Nile, about 32 km (20 mi) northeast of Alexandria on the Mediterranean Sea. It became inundated; its remains are located in Abu Qir Bay, which in 2022 was 7 km (4.3 mi) off the coast and approximately 5.8 m (19 ft) underwater, and near Abukir. The sanctuary of Neith of Sais was located in Thonis. A stele found on the site indicates that late in its history the city was known by both its Egyptian and Greek names.

The legendary beginnings of Thonis go back to as early as the 12th century BC, and it is mentioned by ancient Greek historians. Its importance grew particularly during the waning days of the pharaohs.

== History ==
Thonis was originally built on some adjoining islands in the Nile Delta. The city was built around a central temple, and was intersected by canals with a number of harbors and anchorages. Its wharves, temples, and tower-houses were linked by ferries, bridges, and pontoons. The city was an emporion (trading port) and by the Late Period it was the country's main port for international trade and collection of taxes. It had a sister city, Naucratis, which was another trading port lying 72 km (45 mi) farther up the Nile. Goods were transferred inland via Naucratis, or they were transported via the Western Lake and through a water channel to the nearby town of Canopus for onward distribution.

Image of Khonsu, an Egyptian god of the moon associated with Herakles by the Greeks

Thonis had a large temple of Khonsu, son of Amun, who was known to the Greeks as Herakles. Later, the worship of Amun became more prominent. During the time when the city especially flourished between the sixth and fourth centuries BC, a large temple of Amun-Gereb, the supreme god of the Egyptians at the time, was located in the middle of the city. King Nectanebo I made many additions to the temple in the fourth century B.C. Sanctuaries in Heracleion dedicated to Osiris and other deities were famous for miraculous healing and attracted pilgrims from a wide area. Archaeologists have found evidence of the celebration of the "Mysteries of Osiris" at Thonis-Heracleion, which occurred each year during the month of Khoiak. The god in his ceremonial boat was brought in procession from the temple of Amun in that city to his shrine in Canopus.

2023 archaeological findings, suggested that Greeks, who were already allowed to trade in the city, "had started to take root" there as early as during the Twenty-sixth Dynasty of Egypt and that likely Greek mercenaries were employed to defend it.

During the second century BC Alexandria superseded Thonis-Heracleion as Egypt's primary port. The importance of Thonis-Heracleion began diminishing with the rise of Alexandria, which was about fifteen miles southwest, in the 2nd century BC. Also in the 2nd century BC, a major weather event, either a tsunami, earthquake, or a combination, pushed the city towards destruction. However, the city was not entirely abandoned until its complete submersion into the sea by the eighth century AD.

=== Submersion and disappearance ===
Over time, the city was weakened by a combination of earthquakes, tsunamis, and rising sea levels. Around 101 BC, probably after a severe flood, the ground on which the central island of Heracleion was built succumbed to soil liquefaction. Earthquakes can also cause liquefaction, and earth tremors and tidal waves were reported by ancient historians during the time of Thonis-Heracleion's submersion. The soil around the south-eastern basin of the Mediterranean is prone to liquefaction. The hard clay turned rapidly into a liquid and the buildings collapsed into the water. A few residents stayed on during the Roman era and the beginning of Arab rule, but by the end of the eighth century AD, what was left of Thonis had sunk beneath the sea. Thonis-Heracleion was left relatively undisturbed beneath the sea floor for 1,200 years. The sand and other debris covered the remains of the city and made accidental discovery unlikely. This kept Thonis-Heracleion preserved. Looters and unsuspecting humans and animals did not have the chance to tarnish the city's remains.

== Greek references and legends ==
iab t	D48A

ḥnt
in hieroglyphs

Thonis-Heracleion is mentioned by many Greek historians of antiquity, including Strabo, Diodorus, and Herodotus. These references to Thonis-Heracleion are often within the context of a story about legendary Greek figures, such as Heracles and Paris, and put the location of the city to be on the coast and adjacent to the Nile.

Strabo wrote that in the distant past the city of Thonis, whose name derived from its king, had been located on a strip of land between the Mediterranean Sea and a canal leading towards the city of Schedia.

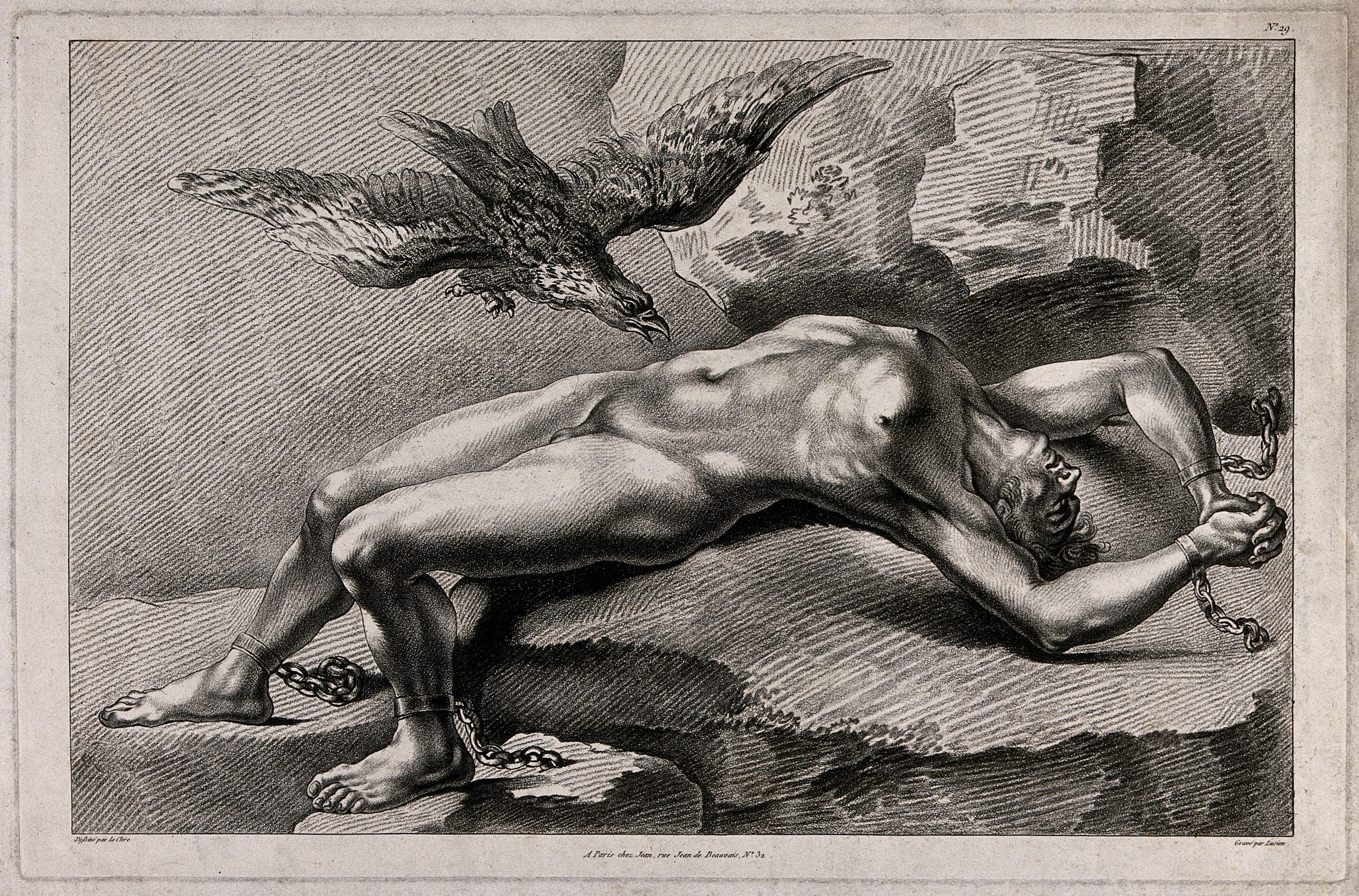
Painting of Prometheus getting his liver eaten by an eagle. Diodorus would claim that Heracles stopping the flood of the Nile river would later become the myth of him slaying this eagle and freeing Prometheus.

Diodorus made mention of Thonis in relation to a story of Heracles, claiming that at one point the Nile river had become greatly inundated and flooded the area in which Prometheus was the governor. Due to the speed that its water flowed, the Nile at that time was called the Aëtus, or eagle, until Heracles stopped the flooding and corrected the river's course back to its original position. Diodorus claimed that the myth of Heracles slaying the eagle which ate the liver of Prometheus had its origins in this event, and that the city of Thonis stood where the Nile now emptied into the Mediterranean.

Herodotus said that Paris and Helen of Troy, fleeing from Menelaus, landed in a region of the Nile delta known as the Canopic mouth. Some of Paris' servants then fled to a nearby temple of Heracles that was built along the coast, and told the temple priests and Thonis, the watchman at the entrance to the Nile, of Paris' taking of Helen from Menelaus. Thonis then captured Paris and his ships, and brought Paris and Helen to Memphis to be judged by Proteus of Egypt. Alternatively it was believed that Menelaus and Helen had stayed there, accommodated by the noble Egyptian Thon and his wife Polydamna. The second century BC Greek poet Nicander wrote that Menelaus's helmsman, Canopus, was bitten by a viper on the sands of Thonis.

== Egyptian references ==
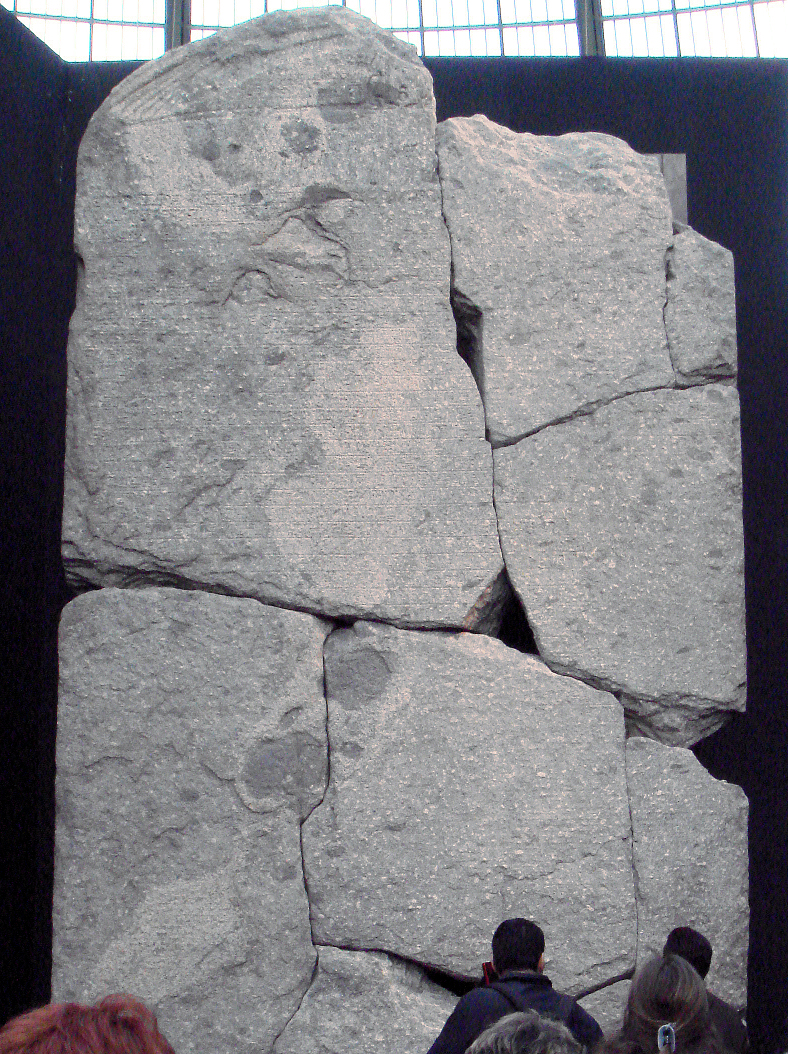
The stela of Ptolemy VIII from the temple of Heracleion

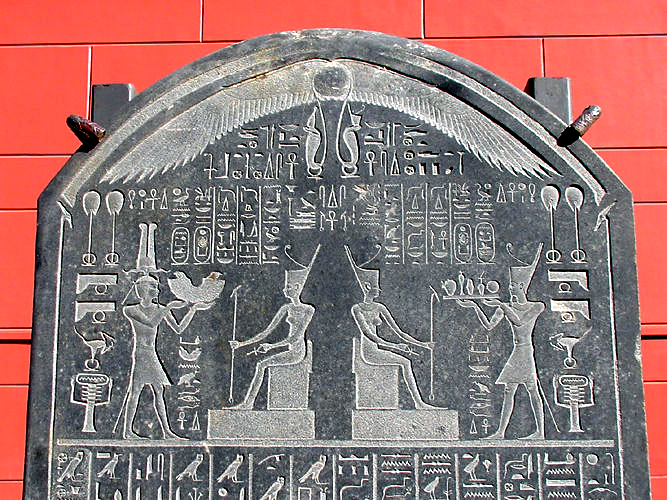
One of the twin steles of the Decree of Nectanebo I. The other stele was not found until Heracleion's discovery in 2000, which led to the revelation that Thonis and Heracleion were the same city.

Until very recently the site had been known only from a few literary and epigraphic sources, one of which interestingly mentions the site as an emporion, just like Naukratis.

Heracleion is also mentioned in the twin steles of the Decree of Nectanebo I (the first of which is known as the 'Stele of Naukratis'), which specify that one tenth of the taxes on imports passing through the town of Thonis (Heracleion) were to be given to the ancient sanctuary of Neith of Sais. Both of the twin steles are on display at the Graeco-Roman-Museum in Alexandria. The city is also mentioned in the Decree of Canopus honoring Pharaoh Ptolemy III, which describes donations, sacrifices and a procession on water.

== Discovery and excavation process ==
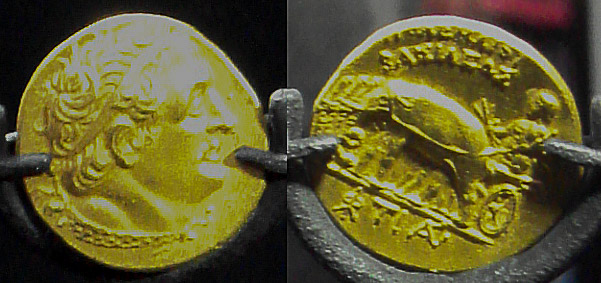
Ptolemaic coins from the submerged Heracleion

Before the discovery of the second stele in 2000, most historians believed that Thonis and Heracleion were two separate cities, both located on what is now the Egyptian mainland. The stele was found at the temple of Heracleion, with an order from Nectanebo I stating that it be placed in the city of Thonis, proving that Thonis and Heracleion were actually one and the same. The ruins submerged in the sea were located and excavated by the French underwater archaeologist Franck Goddio and his team of the IEASM in collaboration with the Ministry for Antiquities of Egypt after a five-year search. Goddio and his team first researched the historical texts concerning the area and used that information to narrow down the possible location of the site. Then, the team used a combination of several pieces of technology, including non-intrusive cutting-edge technology like a nuclear magnetic resonance magnetometer, multi-beam bathymetry, sidescan sonar, sub-bottom profiler and satellite positioning systems in order to map the site. These are relatively new technologies that were useful in the complex process of research and excavation. After the site was mapped, the team slowly began excavations. Several devices were used for the underwater excavations. The team used a grid reference system to document the exact positioning of the artifacts. They also created an excavation plan. The team labeled or tagged every artifact and documented its exact position. They used a water dredge to further uncover the artifacts. The team consisted of archaeologists, as well as artists and photographers to document the finds. The team conducted dives at the site in a tightly coordinated schedule for about a month period in order to maximize their time there. They systematically uncovered various portions of the site during their allotted time frame. Goddio's team's policy is to leave the artifacts in place, unless they get permission from the proper authorities that the artifacts may be raised for conservation efforts or to safeguard their preservation. When there was a cause to raise an artifact from the water, the team tagged it, and placed it within a plastic bag and then raised the artifact to the surface in a basket. However, if the artifact was too large, such as the various statues, the team used a crane from on board their ship, the Princess Duda, to carefully raise the artifact. Once on the ship, the artifacts were cleaned and then went through a desalination process in order to protect them from the dry air after a long submersion underwater.

Numerous finds from the site have indicated that the city's period of major activity ran from the sixth to the fourth century BC, with finds of pottery and coins appearing to stop at the end of the second century BC. Goddio's finds have also included incomplete statues of the god Serapis and the queen Arsinoe II who became king.

Maritime archaeologists have begun using 3D technologies more consistently due to the “improvement of a suite of sonar, laser, optical and other sensor-based technologies capable of capturing terrestrial, intertidal, seabed and sub-seabed sediments in 3D and in high resolution”. These technologies allow the archaeologists to scan the sites and create accurate, precise maps and images of the site. This is especially useful because the site is submerged underwater.

== Archaeological finds ==
From 2009 to 2011 a baris, a type of ancient Nile river boat, was excavated from the waters of Thonis-Heracleion. Its design was found to be consistent with a description written by Herodotus in 450 BC.

The quick destruction of the buildings and slow submersion of Thonis-Heracleion allows archaeologists to now study the underwater city with its surplus of archaeological evidence. One of the most important remains is the stele that was found near the temple of Amun-Gereb. Written on the black, granodiorite stele is a decree of King Nectanebo I, which raises subsidies for the temple. This stele also confirms the name of the city as Thonis since the name of the city was written into the inscription. Until this point, archaeologists and historians had thought that Thonis and Heracleion were separate cities, but this discovery solidified that the two cities were actually the same city. Other important remains are the boats that were sunk around Thonis-Heracleion. There are around seventy ships near the city. This is the largest deposit of ships ever discovered in the ancient world. The massive number of ships gives great resources to nautical archaeologists in terms of researching various aspects of the ships, such as the style in which they were built and the materials used in their construction. A statue of either Cleopatra II or Cleopatra III wearing the tunic of the goddess Isis was also discovered. A large, intact statue of the god Hapi was found at the site. He is depicted holding a tray of four loaves of bread. Many gold coins, statues of deities, jewelry, ritual animal sarcophagi, and ceramic pieces were uncovered at the site; these artifacts give archaeologists a wide range of items to study. A portion of the ceramic pieces were Greek in origin; this adds to the evidence of a large Greek population living at Thonis-Heracleion. The research at the site is still ongoing, and excavations are continuing every year. Goddio estimates that only 5% of the city has been excavated so far. The archaeologists are continuing to search for artifacts and remains of the city. Because there is so much left to excavate at Thonis-Heracleion, there is a lot of potential for new discoveries of important artifacts or more building remains.

In July 2019, a tholos, small Greek temple, ancient granite columns, treasure-carrying ships, and bronze coins from the reign of Ptolemy II, dating back to the third and fourth centuries BC, were found at Thonis-Heracleion by IEASM, a team of Egyptian and European archeologists led by Goddio.

In August 2021, IEASM announced the excavation of a rare Ptolemaic galley. The 25-metre (82 ft) long galley featured classic mortise and tenon joints, alongside more Egyptian features, such as a flat-bottomed construction favourable for navigating the Nile and the Nile Delta. This ancient war ship in the sunken city was trapped under heavy materials, such as stone, that fell from the crumbling buildings during the catastrophes that caused Thonis-Heracleion's destruction. The ship was harbored near the Temple of Amun, and it was held in place on the ocean floor by the heavy building materials until its discovery. It is a Greek war ship with a sail and oars, and it was constructed using Egyptian elements, as well. It brings new knowledge to light about the combined shipbuilding efforts of the Egyptians and the Greeks living at Thonis-Heracleion, which had a high Greek population. Also, a tumulus was discovered, covered with numerous offerings including wicker baskets containing fruits of the doum palm tree and grape seeds dating to the early 4th century BC, alongside a number of Greek ceramic some with black and red figures likely imported from Attica; a wooden sofa used for banquets was also found, alongside a gold amulet of high quality. The artifacts were probably preserved within an underground room or buried soon after being offered, despite the city's having continued to exist well after the 4th century. This discovery documents the settlement of Greek merchants and mercenaries in the city of Thonis-Heracleion.

On 19 September 2023, the Institut Européen d'Archéologie Sous-Marine announced the discovery of the site of a temple to god Amun and a Greek sanctuary devoted to Aphrodite in the ancient port city of Thonis-Heracleion, together with many ancient Egyptian and Greek artifacts, including ancient Greek weapons.

== See also ==
- List of ancient Egyptian towns and cities
- Menouthis
- Mysteries of Osiris
