= Abu Qir Bay =

Bay on the Mediterranean coast of Egypt

- خليج أبو قير (Arabic)
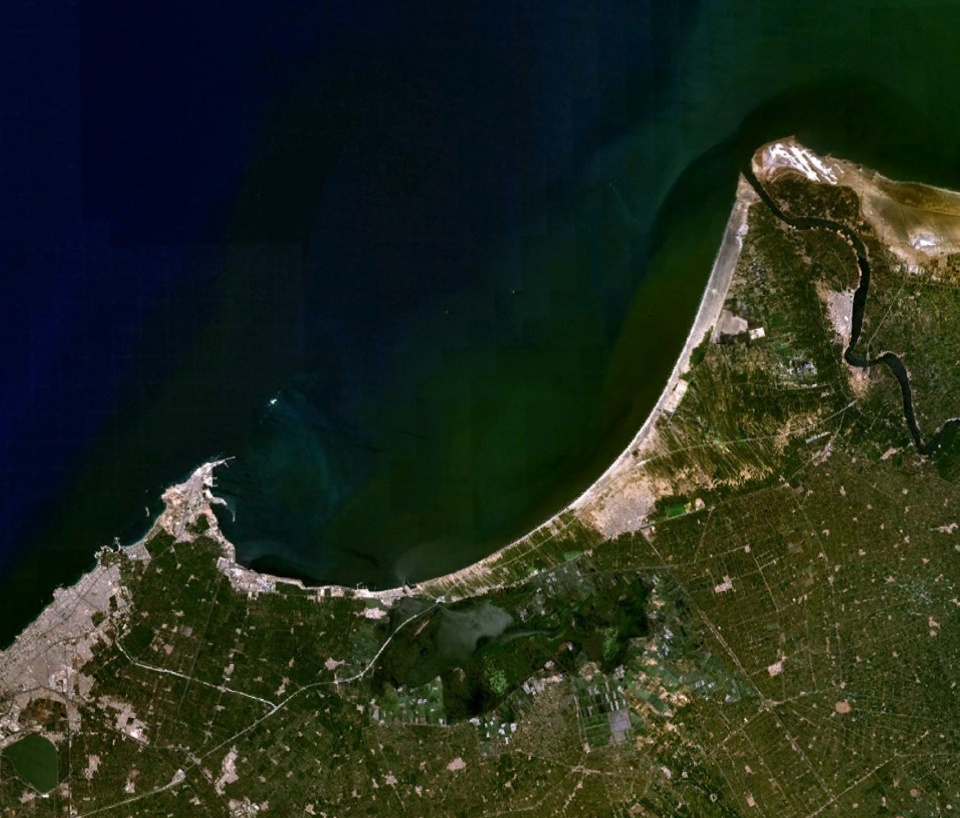
- Satellite view of Abu Qir Bay

- Abu Qir Bay in Egypt
- Location: Beheira Governorate
- Coordinates: 31°18′N 30°10′E
- Type: Bay
- Etymology: Abu Qir is Arabic for "Father Cyrus", a martyr of the Coptic Church.
- Part of: Mediterranean Sea
- Primary inflows: Rosetta mouth of the Nile, Lake Idku
- Surface area: 500–600 km^{2} (190–230 sq mi)
- Average depth: 10–12 m (33–39 ft)
- Max. depth: 18 m (59 ft)
- Water volume: 5–6 km^{3} (1.2–1.4 cu mi)
- Surface elevation: Sea level
- References: Eutrophication: causes, consequences and control.

The Abū Qīr Bay (sometimes transliterated Abukir Bay or Aboukir Bay; Arabic: خليج أبو قير, romanized: Khalīj Abū Qīr) is a spacious bay on the Mediterranean Sea near Alexandria in Egypt, lying between the Rosetta mouth of the Nile and the town of Abu Qir. The ancient cities of Canopus, Heracleion and Menouthis lie submerged beneath the waters of the bay. In 1798 it was the site of the Battle of the Nile, a naval battle fought between the British Royal Navy and the navy of the French First Republic. The bay contains a natural gas field, discovered in the 1970s.

== Geography ==
Abu Qir Bay lies approximately 20 kilometres (12 mi) east of Alexandria, bounded to the southwest by the Abu Qir headland, on which lies the town of Abu Qir, and to the northeast by the Rosetta mouth of the Nile. The bay is a highly fertile Egyptian coastal region but suffers from acute eutrophication and pollution from untreated industrial and domestic waste. The ABU QIR Fertilizers and Chemicals Industries Company, a large producer of nitrogen fertilizer, is located on the bay.

== Land submersion ==
Classical sources indicate that the Canopic branch of the Nile Delta once entered the sea in the vicinity of Heracleion or the eastern part of Canopus. A combination of Islamic texts and investigation using geoarchaeology suggest that this branch was still in existence in the eighth century, when a major inundation caused eastern Canopus to sink into the bay. The Canopic branch subsequently declined and eventually became closed.

Land in the area of Canopus was subject to rising sea levels, earthquakes, tsunamis, and large parts of it seem to have already succumbed to soil liquefaction sometime at the end of the 2nd century BC, becoming submerged.

== Antiquities ==
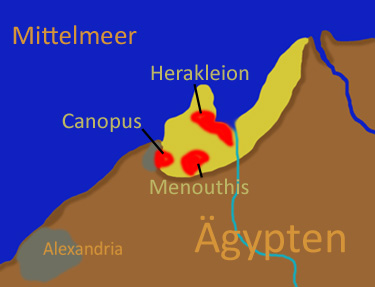
Map of Nile Delta showing ancient Canopus, Heracleion, and Menouthis

In ancient times Abu Qir Bay was surrounded by marshland and contained several islands. As early as the 7th century BC, port cities were established on the bay. The bay now contains the underwater archaeological sites of three cities from the pre-Hellenistic, Hellenistic and Roman periods. The eastern part of ancient city of Canopus is submerged in the bay, along with the remains of Menouthis and its sister-city Herakleion–Thonis which now lies 7 kilometres offshore. They were excavated by French underwater archaeologist Franck Goddio.

In November 2017, the Egyptian mission in cooperation with the European Institute for Underwater Archaeology announced the discovery of 2.000-year-old three sunken shipwrecks dated back to the Roman Era in Alexandria's Abu Qir Bay.

The sunken cargo included a royal head of crystal perhaps belong to the commander of the Roman armies of “Antonio”, three gold coins from the era of Emperor Octavius Augustus, large wooden planks and pottery vessels.

In July 2019, a smaller Greek temple and ancient granite columns, treasure-laden ships, along with bronze coins from the reign of Ptolemy II, pottery dating back to the third and fourth centuries BC were found at the sunken city of Heracleion, known as Egypt's Atlantis. The investigations were conducted by Egyptian and European divers led by the underwater archaeologist Franck Goddio. They also uncovered an absolutely devastated historic underwater temple (city's main temple) off Egypt's north coast.

A number of sunken ships have been excavated from the bay, including a ceremonial boat (Neshmet boat) dedicated to Osiris and several Roman era ships.

== Battle of the Nile ==
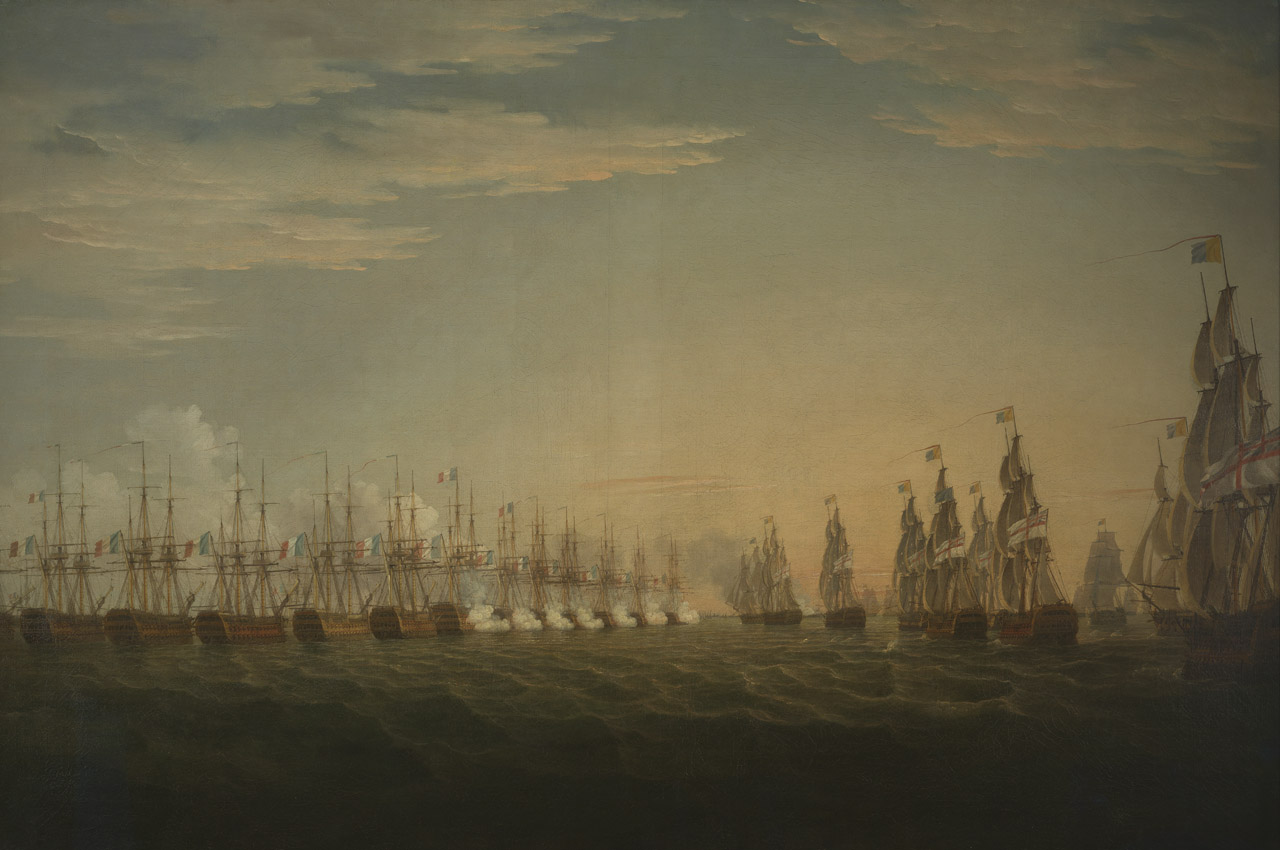
British ships attacking French ships at Abukir

On August 1, 1798, Horatio Nelson fought the naval "Battle of the Nile", often referred to as the "Battle of Aboukir Bay". (Not to be confused with the Battle of Abukir (1799) and the Battle of Abukir (1801).)

On 1 March 1801, some 70 British warships, together with transports carrying 16,000 troops, anchored in Aboukir Bay near Alexandria. The intent was to defeat the French expeditionary force that had remained in Egypt after Napoleon's return to France.

Bad weather delayed disembarkation by a week but, on 8 March, Captain Alexander Cochrane of HMS Ajax deployed 320 boats, in double line abreast, to bring the troops ashore. French shore batteries opposed the landing, but the British were able to drive them back and, by the next day, all of Sir Ralph Abercromby's British army was ashore. The British then defeated the French army at the Battle of Alexandria. The Siege of Alexandria followed, with the city falling on 2 September 1801.

L’Orient, Napoleon's flagship, was destroyed by Nelson's fleet and lies in the bay on the sea bottom. It was carrying five million francs in gold and one million in silver plate taken from the Knights Hospitaller in Malta. Between 1998 and 1999, French archaeologist Franck Goddio led an expedition that carried out an underwater archaeological study of the wreck-site.

== Nelson's Island ==
Nelson's Island, also known as Aboukir Island, is a 350 m (1,150 ft)-long island in Abu Qir bay that is used for picnics and recreation. The island has been reduced considerably in size since antiquity as a result of erosion and sandstone quarrying. When it was a part of Ancient Egypt it was probably connected to the mainland at what is now the Aboukir naval base. In Pharaonic times the island lay on a primary commercial route to the Nile River and became a major religious and commercial centre. There is archaeological evidence that a high-status necropolis was sited on the island. During the Ptolemaic Kingdom the island was fortified.

Following the Battle of the Nile in 1798, a number of British dead were buried on the island. Their graves were discovered in 2000. As they were in danger of sea erosion, thirty bodies were reburied at Chatby Commonwealth War Graves Cemetery in Alexandria in 2005.

== See also ==
- Lake Burullus
- Lake Mariout
