= Lettre à M. Dacier =

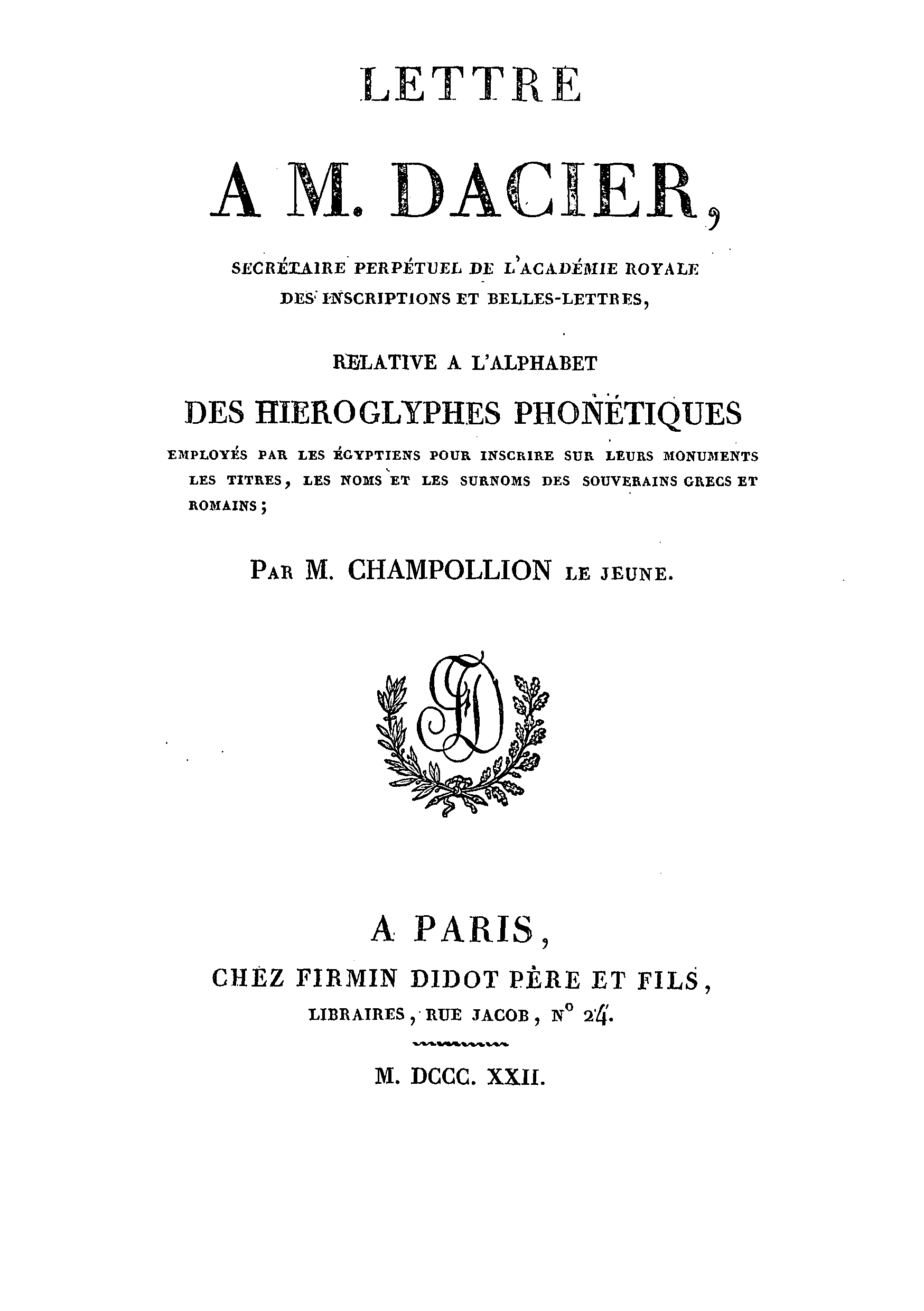
Cover of the first edition of Lettre à M. Dacier by Jean-François Champollion.

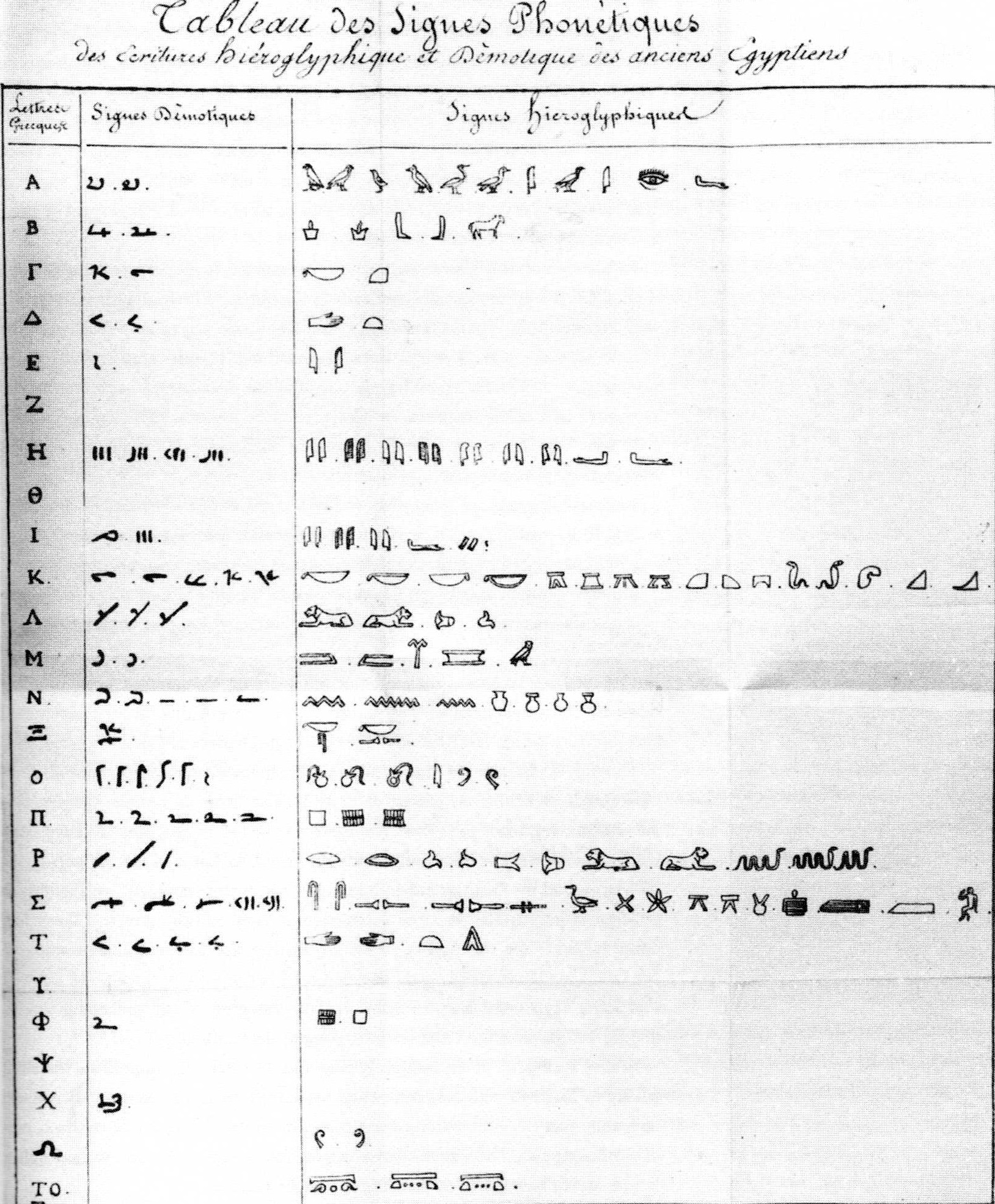
The table of Coptic, demotic and hieroglyphic phonetic characters that appears as an illustration in the Lettre à M. Dacier

Lettre à M. Dacier (full title: Lettre à M. Dacier relative à l'alphabet des hiéroglyphes phonétiques: "Letter to M. Dacier concerning the alphabet of the phonetic hieroglyphs") is a letter sent in 1822 by the Egyptologist Jean-François Champollion to Bon-Joseph Dacier, secretary of the French Académie des Inscriptions et Belles-Lettres. It is the founding text upon which Ancient Egyptian hieroglyphs were first systematically deciphered by Champollion, largely on the basis of the multilingual Rosetta Stone.

== History ==
On 14 September 1822, while visiting his brother Jacques-Joseph, a great supporter of his ideas, Champollion made a crucial breakthrough in understanding the phonetic nature of hieroglyphs and proclaimed, "Je tiens l'affaire! " ("I've got it!") and then fainted from his excitement.

On 27 September 1822, he exhibited at the Académie des Inscriptions et Belles-Lettres a draft containing eight pages of text to a packed room. The final version was published in late October 1822 by Firmin-Didot in a booklet of 44 pages with four illustrated plates.

== Display at the Louvre ==
On the 150th anniversary of the Lettre in October 1972, the Rosetta Stone was displayed next to it at the Louvre in Paris.

== French text of the Letter ==
"It is a complex system, writing figurative, symbolic, and phonetic all at once, in the same text, the same phrase, I would almost say in the same word."

Jean-François Champollion, Lettre à M. Dacier relative à l'alphabet des hiéroglyphes phonétiques (Paris, 1822) – at French Wikisource

== See also ==
- Decipherment of Egyptian hieroglyphs
- Translation of the letter by Rhys Bryant
