= Grammaire égyptienne =

Book by Jean-François Champollion

Grammaire égyptienne ou Principes généraux de l'écriture sacrée égyptienne appliqué à la présentation de la langue parlée
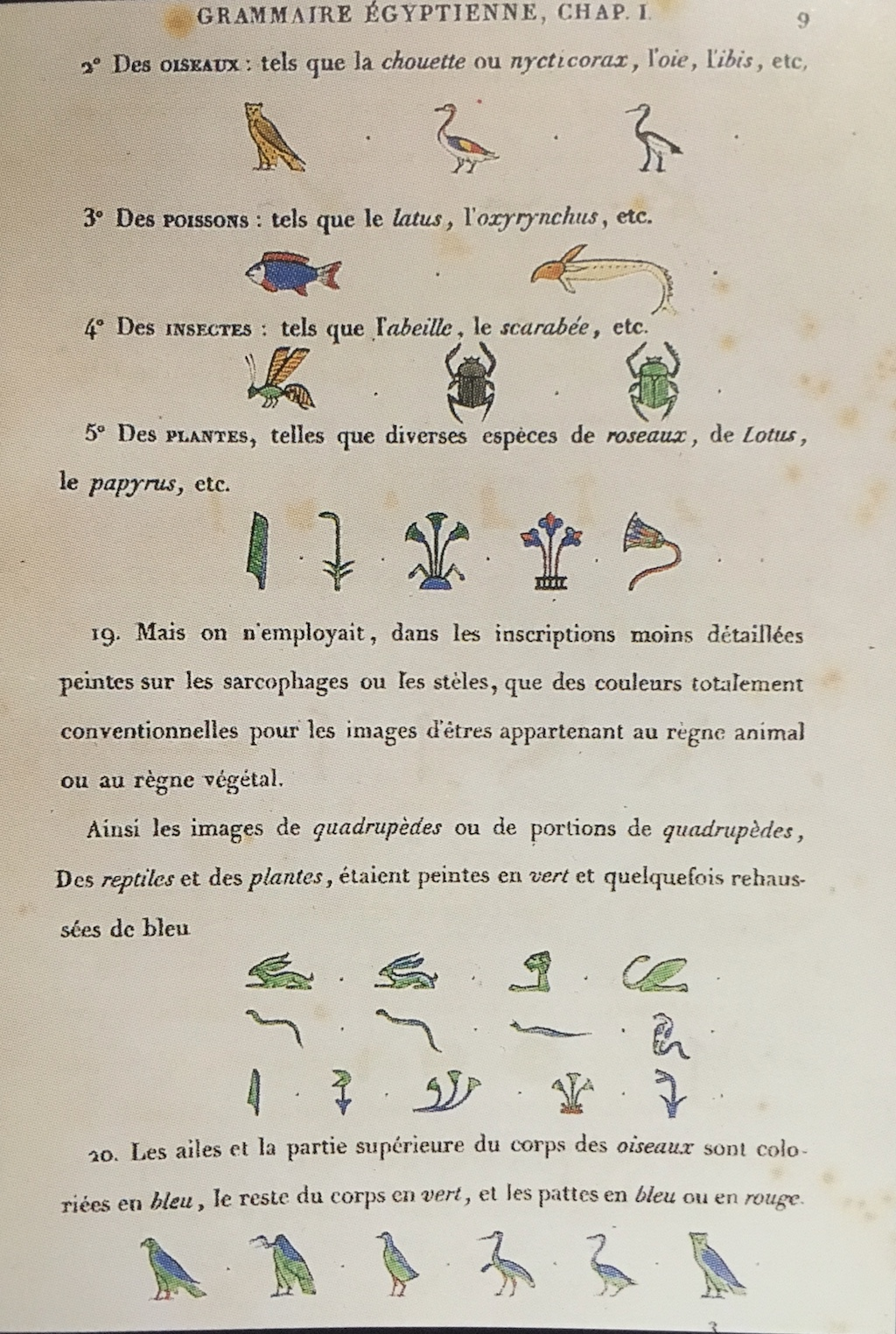
- Grammaire égyptienne, chapter I, page 9
- Author: Jean-François Champollion
- Language: French
- Subject: Ancient Egyptian language
- Genre: Grammatical reference work
- Publisher: Firmin-Didot Frères
- Publication date: 1836
- Publication place: France

Grammaire égyptienne (literally: 'Egyptian Grammar') is a grammar reference book by the French Egyptologist Jean-François Champollion, published posthumously in France in 1836. Its full title, the Grammaire égyptienne ou Principes généraux de l'écriture sacrée égyptienne appliqué à la présentation de la langue parlée means Egyptian Grammar or General Principles of Egyptian Sacred Writing Applied to the Presentation of the Spoken Language.

== Origins ==
Upon his return from Egypt to France on 5 March 1830, after almost twenty months of absence, Champollion immediately gave priority to the clarification of his Grammaire. Like the record cards of Dictionnaire égyptien en écriture hiéroglyphique or the plates of Panthéon égyptien, the Grammaire contains numerous records and drawings reproduced in Egypt, by Champollion himself and his assistants;^{:92} but he died in 1832 without being able to publish it. It was his brother, Jacques-Joseph Champollion, who would handle its publication in 1836. Marcellin Jobard, a lithographer from Brussels, whom claimed to have advised Champollion the use of lithography for the printing of the Grammaire égyptienne. The printing combines lithography and typography, with lithographic stone transfer methods improved by Jules Feuquières, used by Charles Motte's lithographic workshop in Paris, which was responsible for the lithographic printing process of the Grammaire.

Grammaire points out that the Egyptian hieroglyphs are a complex system, writing figurative, symbolic, and phonetic all at once.^{:44} This work went hand in hand with the Dictionnaire égyptien en écriture hiéroglyphique, another work by Champollion which was also published posthumously by his brother in 1841. The aim of Dictionnaire égyptien was to create a complete method of learning hieroglyphic writing. Émile Prisse d'Avennes, a French engineer, became Egyptologist after studying Grammaire égyptienne.^{:41}

== Hieroglyphics ==
Grammaire égyptienne contains many hieroglyphs in a rather particular style.

Hieroglyphs from the Grammaire égyptienne

== Editions ==
There are many editions of this work, notably:

- Grammaire égyptienne ou Principes généraux de l'écriture sacrée égyptienne appliqué à la présentation de la langue parlée, Firmin-Didot Frères, 1836
- Principes généraux de l'écriture sacrée Égyptienne, Institut d'Orient, 1984, ISBN 2-905304-00-6
- Grammaire égyptienne, Solin, 1997, ISBN 2-7427-1558-4
- Grammaire égyptienne, Actes Sud, 1998, 555 pages, ISBN 2-7427-1558-4

== Bibliography ==
- Marie-Christine Claes, "Autour de la Grammaire égyptienne de Champollion : Marcellin Jobard, Charles Motte et Jules Feuquières, utilisateurs de la lithographie pour l'impression des hiéroglyphes", from Bulletin des Musées royaux d'Art et d'Histoire, Brussels, volume 82, 2011 [2013], pp. 55–99.

== Gallery ==
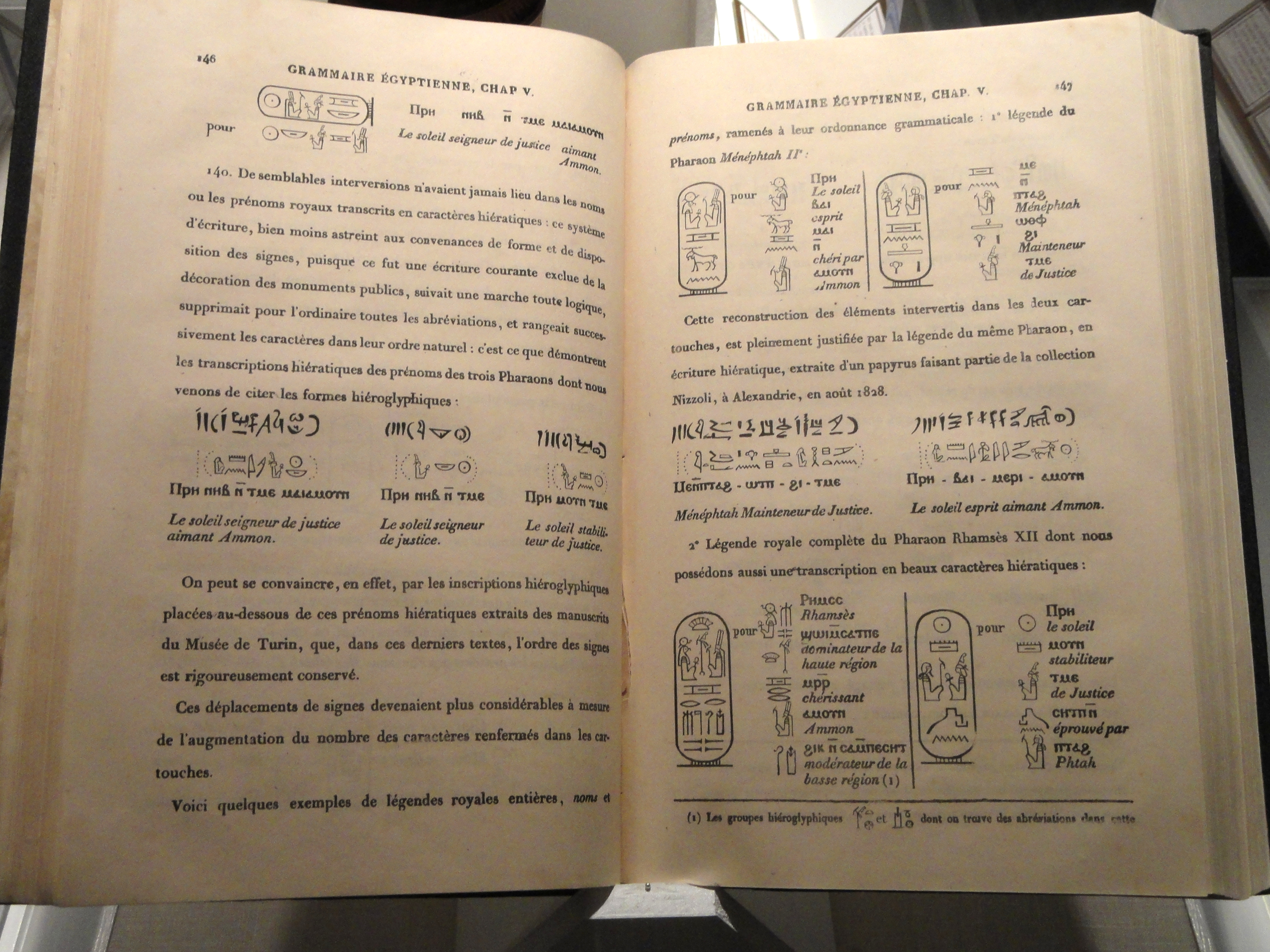
Grammaire égyptienne, chapter V

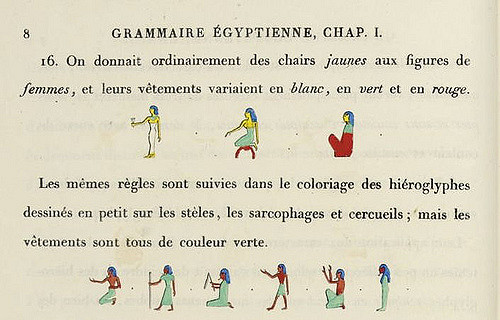
Grammaire égyptienne, chapter I, p. 8

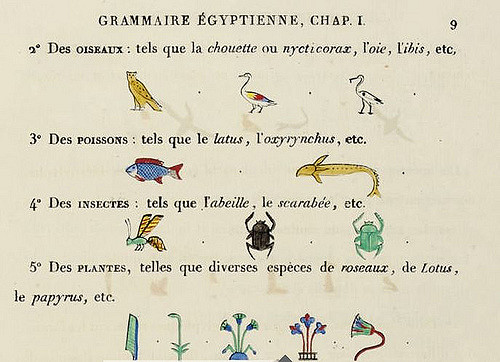
Grammaire égyptienne, chapter I, p. 9

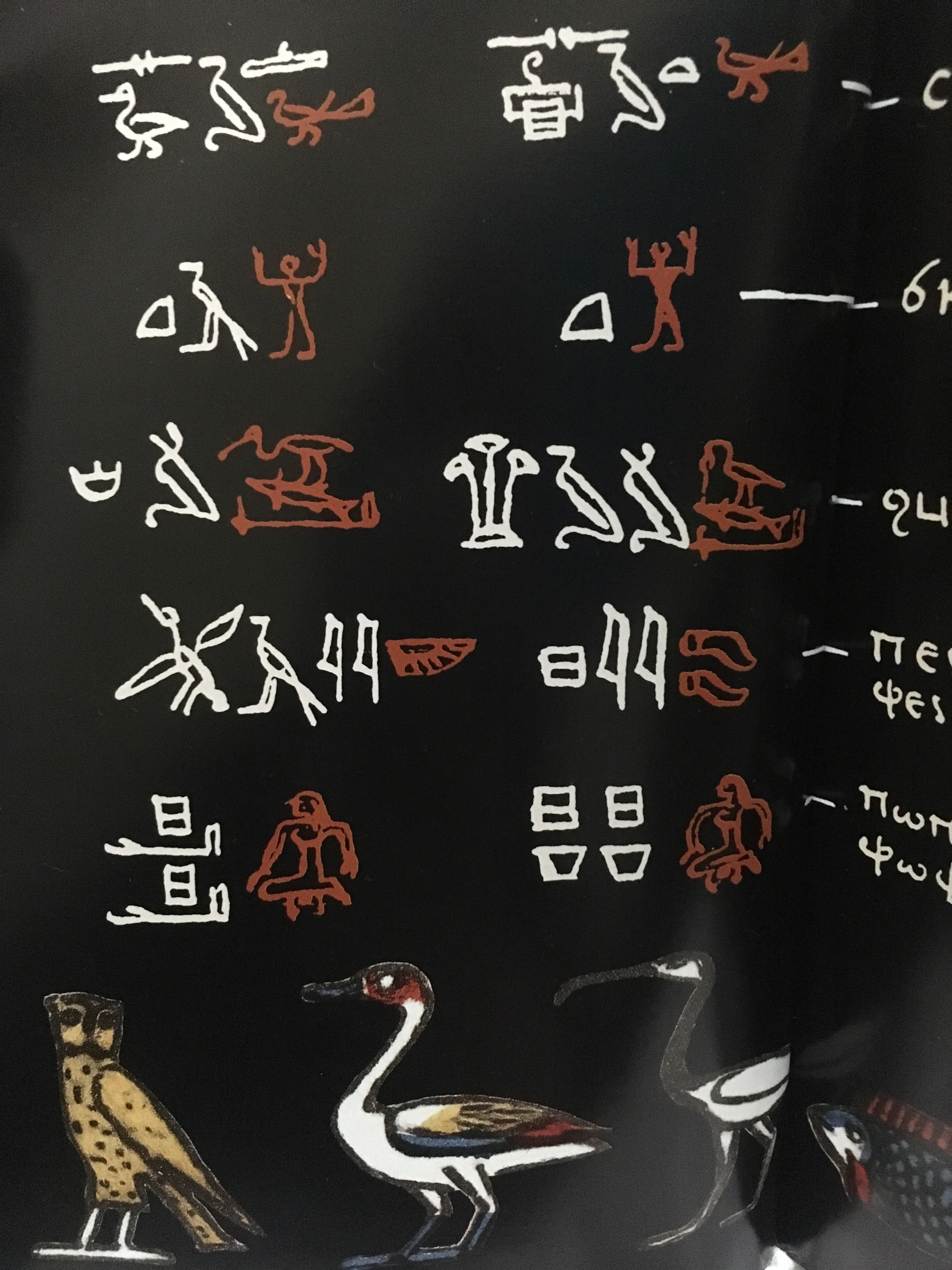
Reproduction of hieroglyphs from the Grammaire

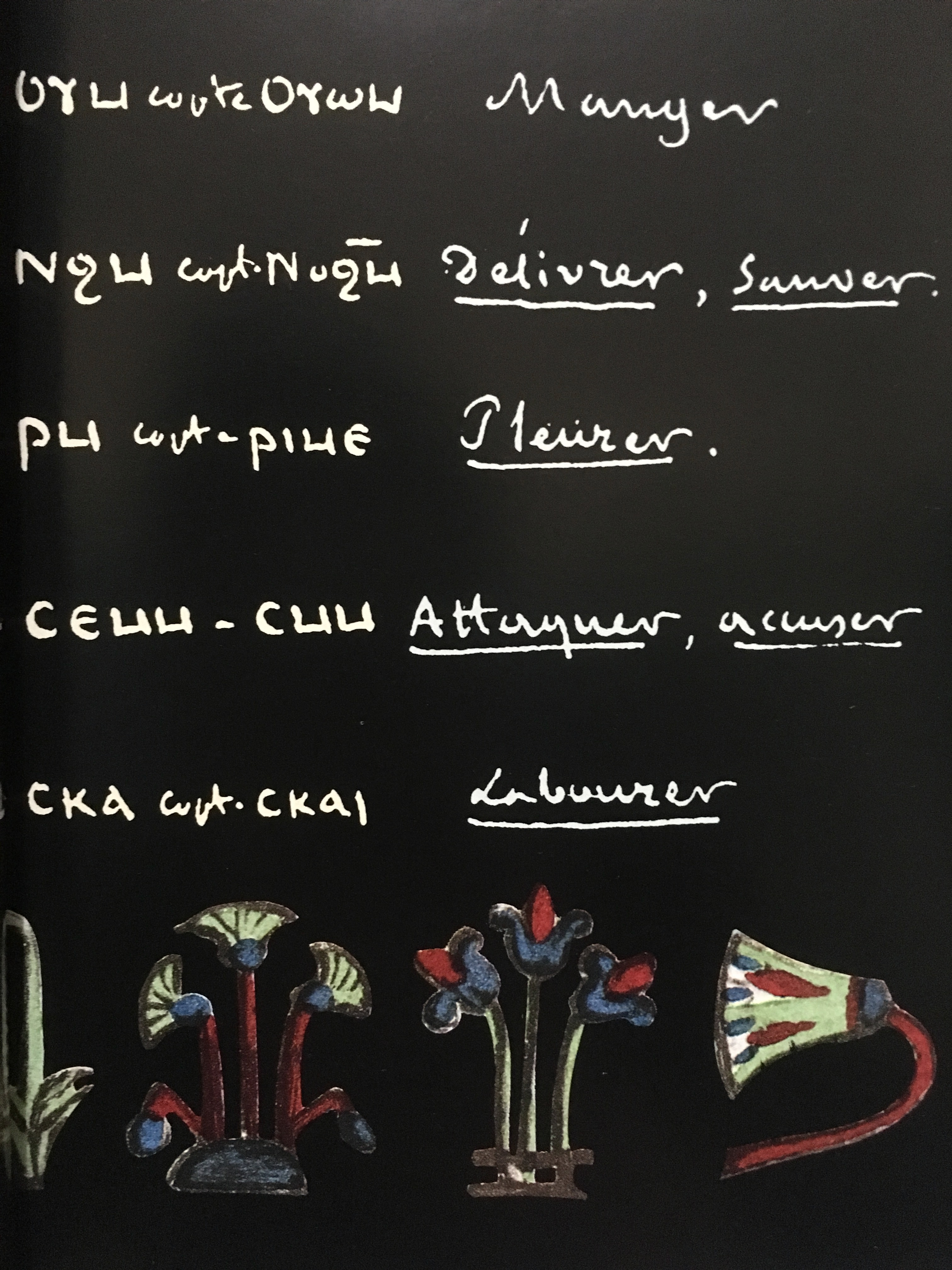
Reproduction of hieroglyphs from the Grammaire

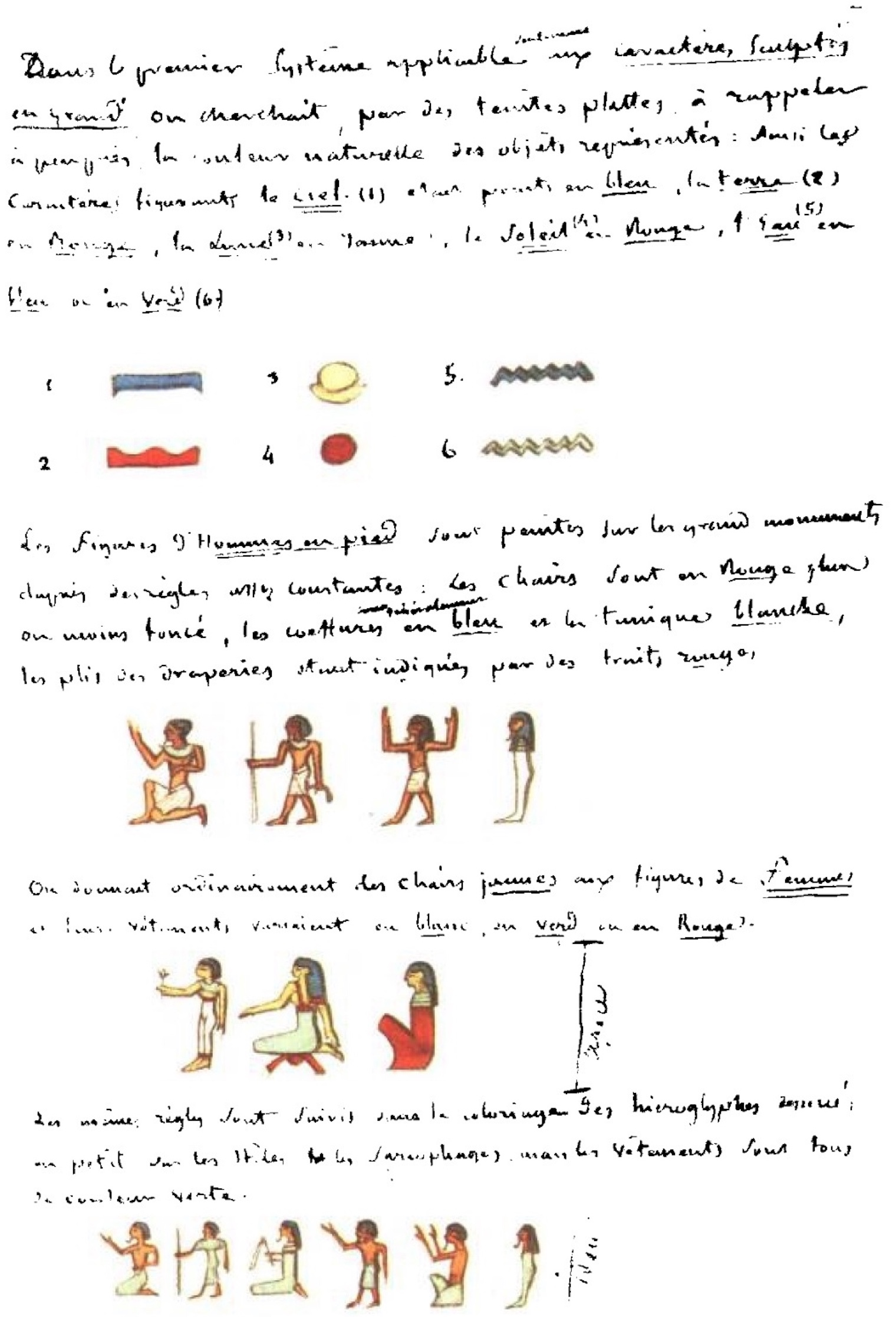
Champollion's handwritten page in the Grammaire
