= Nestor L'Hôte =

French Egyptologist, painter and graphic artist

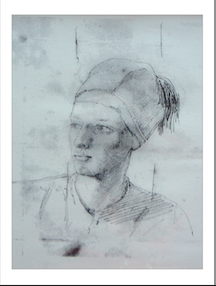
Nestor L'Hôte drawn by Alexandre Duchesne

Nestor Hippolyte Antoine L'Hôte (24 August 1804 – 24 March 1842) was a French Egyptologist, painter and graphic artist. He published hundreds of sketches and drawings of Egypt and its monuments, a body of work mainly executed during the Franco-Tuscan Expedition with Champollion, and during two following missions in Egypt. Most of his originals were bought by the Louvre Museum in 1957, after having disappeared for over a century.

== The Unknown Nestor L'Hôte ==
In the book Travellers in Egypt, Diane Harlé (in charge of Egyptian antiquities at the Louvre Museum) publishes a nine-page article with this title: The Unknown Nestor L'Hôte, maybe the only one readable in English at that time (1998).

"(...) Both parents, of modest origin, could hardly imagine that their son would become one of the companions of Jean-François Champollion, the 'Father of Egyptology' and that three times he would travel in Egypt: once with Champollion (1828-30), and twice on his own (1838-39 and 1840-41). For those two trips he had been asked by the French Government to finish the recording of Egyptian temples started by Champollion. Yet that bright, talented and industrious young man died in Paris on 24 March 1842, poor and forgotten."

"(...) L'Hôte was not the only painter of the Franco-Tuscan Expedition whose name has fallen into the depths of oblivion. Others include Alexandre Adolphe Duchesne (b.1797), François-Edouard Bertin (1791-1871) and Pierre-François Lehoux (1803-83). It is with these three artists that L'Hôte became friendly in Egypt. (...) In Paris, L'Hôte probably wandered often through the Louvre Museum since he was living just on the other side of the Seine at 15, quai Malaquais. During his trip in Egypt, he spoke as a connoisseur when he wrote about Le Lorrain, Poussin, Cimabue, Giotto, Leonardo da Vinci, Raphaël, and made pertinent analogies between their works and the landscape and the people he saw in Egypt."

"(...) Just by looking at L'Hôte's watercolours one can understands that he is a professional - little or no pencil tracing beforehand, little or no gouache. A transparency linked to the boldness of the colours demonstrates the mastery with which L'Hôte used this medium.

The drawings of L'Hôte kept at the Louvre show the same mastery of the watercolours. Drawn on all kind of papers and in different scales, they are of a remarkable quality. The use of criss-crossed lines gives power as well as foreground framing to the views, and suggests the zoom of a camera."

In his notebooks and in numerous letters (mainly sent to his parents), Nestor L'Hôte describes his fascination for Egypt, but also the very hard working conditions of his three expeditions. Diane Harlé translates some of them, focussed on the Panorama of Cairo, seen from the Citadel, and on the Portrait of the Pasha. L'Hôte's style can be appreciated through these few lines, written on September 23, 1828:

"(...) Nothing that we know in Europe, either by description or by painting, could give an idea of that extraordinary view. Never had my admiration so deeply excited. I thought I was dreaming Aladdin and the marvelous tales of A Thousand and One Nights, I thought I saw an idea world, unknown. In front of me, in a single frame, I had all that my imagination for ten years had imagined as most magical and sublime.

It was the time of the day when the sun, having lost his greatest power, still threw a bright light and enveloped the atmosphere with a vague hue, a luminous and speckled mist which appears in certain regions of the globe. Imagine, beyond this sparkling gauze, an unlimited plain crossed by a large river which, like a silver blade, appears out of the haze along the horizon and on your right bathes the walls of twenty palaces; beyond the river, on this side, are the Pyramids of Giza whose proud mass has braved centuries and survived destruction; in front and towards the background are the Pyramids of Sakkarah, much older; a girdle of sand surrounds them and cuts off the horizon on that side; beyond the Pyramids is a pleasant plain, intersected by numerous divisions of the river into so many ribbons, from which rise minarets, villages and thick woods. (...) Nearer to you, these ruins appear in their actual dimensions and form pleasant groupings detached in their semi-tints against the background. Nearer yet is the necropolis of the califs, the city of tombs, and an immense vaulted aqueduc; then minarets, domes, platforms and at last the town of Cairo at your feet, so elegant, its bold minarets, its thousands of terraces, and its enormous mosques of which a vivid colour brings out the entire picture and makes remote the entire perspective. That is a detail of the tableau we have before our eyes, but the general effect, the grandeur, the harmony of this magnificent tableau, is what strikes us with a kind of stupor; but to depict it words fail, and it would be necessary in order to render the magic of this marvel, to borrow the sun's rays and trace the painting with gold and azure."

== Works ==
- Notice historique sur les obélisques égyptiens, et en particulier sur l'obélisque de Louqsor, rédigée d'après les meilleurs documents, et offrant les noms et époques des rois qui ont fait ériger ces différens monolithes. 1836. Leleux, Paris, col. : Musée des Antiquités Égyptiennes. Online version
- Lettres écrites d'Égypte, en 1838 et 1839 : contenant des observations sur divers monuments égyptiens nouvellement explorés et dessinés, avec des remarques de M. Letronne. 1840. Firmin-Didot, Paris. Online version
- Lettre sur les monuments qui entourent les pyramides de Ghizé. 1841. Le Journal des Scavans. Online version
- Lettres sur l'Egypte en 1841. 1841. Revue des Deux Mondes, Paris. Online version

== Bibliography ==
- Harlé, Diane (1998). The Unknown Nestor L'Hôte in Travellers in Egypt edited by Paul Starkey and Janet Starkey. I.B.Tauris Publishers pp. 121-129. Online version
- Harlé, Diane; Lefebvre Jean (1993). Sur le Nil avec Champollion, Lettres, journaux et dessins inédits de Nestor L'Hôte, Premier Voyage en Égypte - 1828-1830. Éditions Paradigme.
- Harlé, Diane (1990/91). Le Ramesseum de Nestor L'Hôte. Memnomia n° 1, 67-69. Online version
- Vandier d'Abbadie, Jeanne (1963). Nestor L'Hôte (1804-1842). ZJ Brill, Leiden. Online version
- Horeau, Hector (1843). Notices biographiques Nestor L'Hôte. Revue de l'Orient, vol. 1, pp. 225–230. Online version
- L'Hôte, Édouard (1842). "Nestor L'Hôte, ses voyages et ses travaux". Revue de Paris, vol. 9, pp. 108–121 Online version
