= Raphia Decree =

Ancient inscribed stone stela dating from ancient Egypt

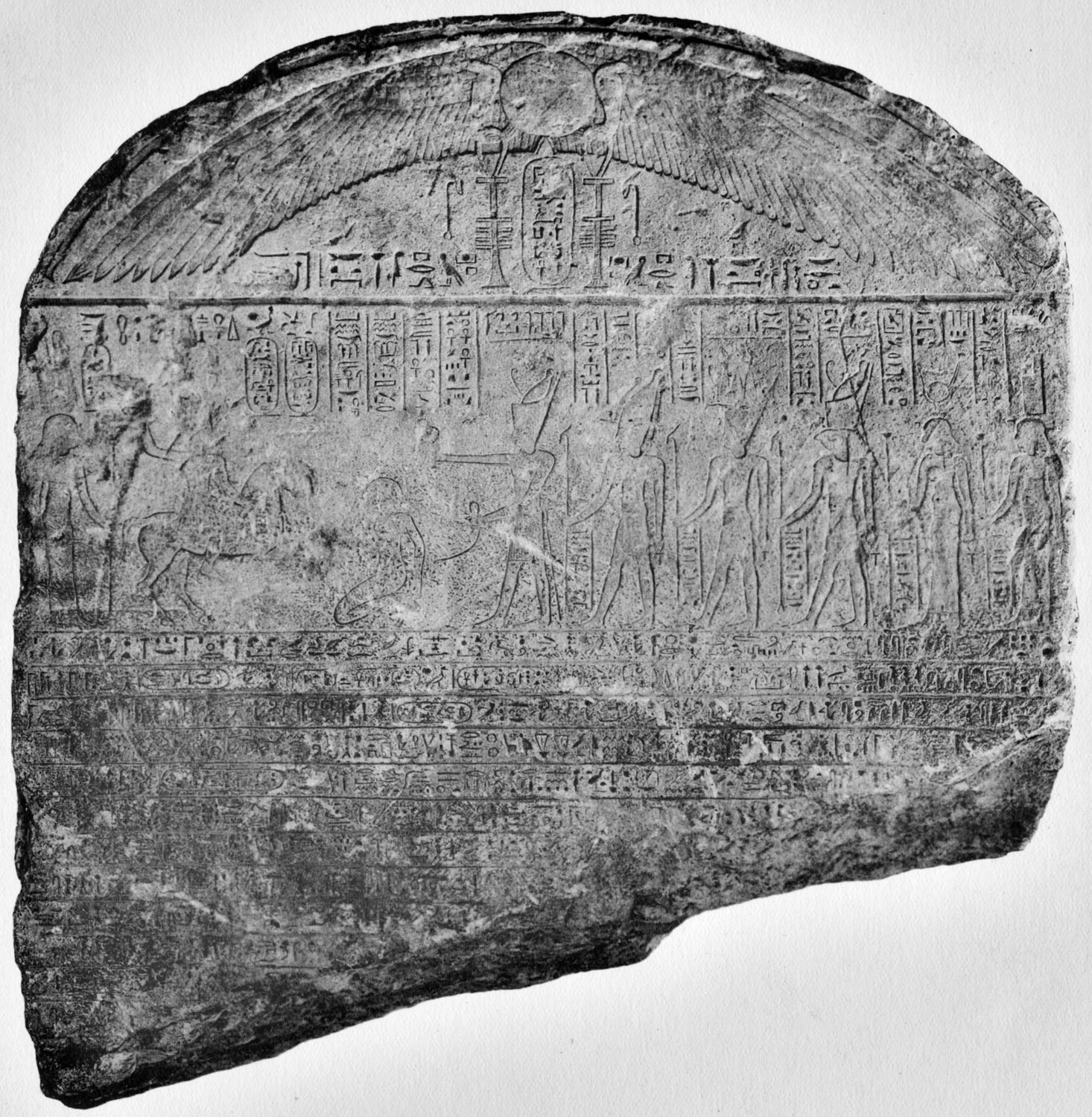
The Raphia decree, found at Memphis.

The Raphia Decree is an ancient inscribed stone stela dating from ancient Egypt. It comprises the second of the Ptolemaic Decrees issued by a synod of Egyptian priests meeting at Memphis under Ptolemy IV of the Hellenistic Ptolemaic dynasty, which ruled Egypt from 305 BC to 30 BC. The slab dates itself to 217 BC, and celebrates Ptolemy IV's victory at the Battle of Raphia.

Like the Rosetta Stone, this decree is inscribed in three writing systems. It is bilingual, in ancient Egyptian language and Greek, and written in Egyptian hieroglyphs, Egyptian Demotic and Greek. A partial copy is on the stone known as the Memphis Stele, and a nearly complete copy is found on the Pithom Stele II.

== See also ==
- Ptolemaic Decrees
- Decree of Canopus, for Ptolemy III
- Rosetta Stone decree, for Ptolemy V
