= Great Mendes Stela =

The Great Mendes Stela is a commemorative stele erected during the Ptolemaic dynasty by Ptolemy II Philadelphus for Mendes, Lower Egypt. Ptolemies III through V also had stelae, including the bilingual, three-script Decree of Canopus, the Nubayrah Stele, and the Rosetta Stone.
