= Decipherment of ancient Egyptian scripts =

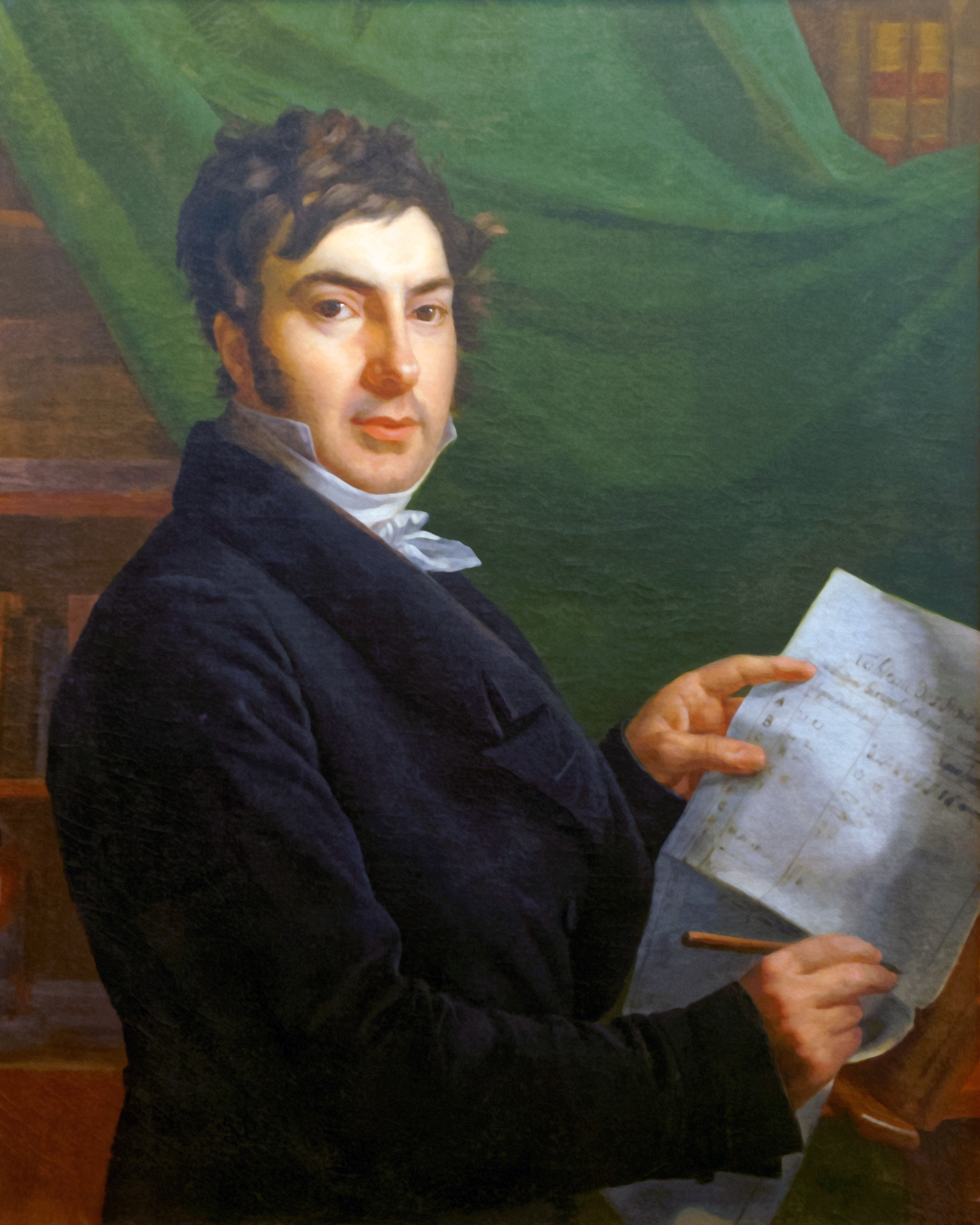
Jean-François Champollion in 1823, holding his list of phonetic hieroglyphic signs. Portrait by Victorine-Angélique-Amélie Rumilly.

The writing systems used in ancient Egypt were deciphered in the early nineteenth century through the work of several European scholars, especially Jean-François Champollion and Thomas Young. Ancient Egyptian forms of writing, which included the hieroglyphic, hieratic and demotic scripts, ceased to be understood in the fourth and fifth centuries AD, as the Coptic alphabet was increasingly used in their place. Later generations' knowledge of the older scripts was based on the work of Greek and Roman authors whose understanding was faulty. It was thus widely believed that Egyptian scripts were exclusively ideographic, representing ideas rather than sounds. Some attempts at decipherment by Islamic and European scholars in the Middle Ages and early modern times acknowledged the script might have a phonetic component, but perception of hieroglyphs as purely ideographic hampered efforts to understand them as late as the eighteenth century.

The Rosetta Stone, discovered in 1799 by members of Napoleon Bonaparte's campaign in Egypt, bore a parallel text in hieroglyphic, demotic and Greek. It was hoped that the Egyptian text could be deciphered through its Greek translation, especially in combination with the evidence from the Coptic language, the last stage of the Egyptian language. Doing so proved difficult, despite halting progress made by Antoine-Isaac Silvestre de Sacy and Johan David Åkerblad. Thomas Young, building on their work, observed that demotic characters were derived from hieroglyphs and identified several of the phonetic signs in demotic. He also identified the meaning of many hieroglyphs, including phonetic glyphs in a cartouche containing the name of an Egyptian king of foreign origin, Ptolemy V. He was convinced, however, that phonetic hieroglyphs were used only in writing non-Egyptian words. In the early 1820s Champollion compared Ptolemy's cartouche with others and realised the hieroglyphic script was a mixture of phonetic and ideographic elements. His claims were initially met with scepticism and with accusations that he had taken ideas from Young without giving credit, but they gradually gained acceptance. Champollion went on to roughly identify the meanings of most phonetic hieroglyphs and establish much of the grammar and vocabulary of ancient Egyptian. Young, meanwhile, largely deciphered demotic using the Rosetta Stone in combination with other Greek and demotic parallel texts.

Decipherment efforts languished after Young and Champollion died, but in 1837 Karl Richard Lepsius pointed out that many hieroglyphs represented combinations of two or three sounds rather than one, thus correcting one of the most fundamental faults in Champollion's work. Other scholars, such as Emmanuel de Rougé, refined the understanding of Egyptian enough that by the 1850s it was possible to fully translate ancient Egyptian texts. Combined with the decipherment of cuneiform at approximately the same time, their work opened up the once-inaccessible texts from the earliest stages of ancient history.

== Egyptian scripts and their extinction ==
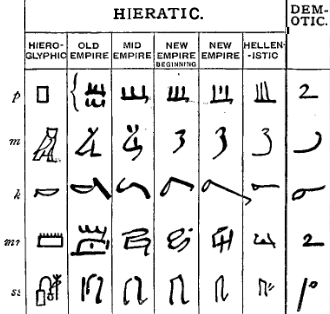
Table showing the evolution of hieroglyphic signs (left) through several stages of hieratic into demotic (right)

For most of its history ancient Egypt had two major writing systems. Hieroglyphs, a system of pictorial signs used mainly for formal texts, originated sometime around 3200 BC. Hieratic, a cursive system derived from hieroglyphs that was used mainly for writing on papyrus, was nearly as old. Beginning in the seventh century BC, a third script derived from hieratic, known today as demotic, emerged. It differed so greatly from its hieroglyphic ancestor that the relationship between the signs is difficult to recognise. (Note: The scholars who deciphered Egyptian differed on what to call this script. Thomas Young termed it "enchorial", based on the phrase referring to the script in the Greek text of the Rosetta Stone: ενχωριοις, meaning "of the country", "vernacular", or "native". Jean-François Champollion used a term from the works of the Greek historian Herodotus: δημοτική or "demotic", a Greek word meaning "in common use". Champollion's term eventually became the conventional name.) Demotic became the most common system for writing the Egyptian language, and hieroglyphic and hieratic were thereafter mostly restricted to religious uses. In the fourth century BC, Egypt came to be ruled by the Greek Ptolemaic dynasty, and Greek and demotic were used side-by-side in Egypt under Ptolemaic rule and then that of the Roman Empire. Hieroglyphs became increasingly obscure, used mainly by Egyptian priests.

All three scripts contained a mix of phonetic signs, representing sounds in the spoken language, and ideographic signs, representing ideas. Phonetic signs included uniliteral, biliteral and triliteral signs, standing respectively for one, two or three sounds. Ideographic signs included logograms, representing whole words, and determinatives, which were used to specify the meaning of a word written with phonetic signs.

Many Greek and Roman authors wrote about these scripts, and many were aware that the Egyptians had two or three writing systems, but none whose works survived into later times fully understood how the scripts worked. Diodorus Siculus, in the first century BC, explicitly described hieroglyphs as an ideographic script, and most classical authors shared this assumption. Plutarch, in the first century AD, referred to 25 Egyptian letters, suggesting he might have been aware of the phonetic aspect of hieroglyphic or demotic, but his meaning is unclear. Around AD 200 Clement of Alexandria hinted that some signs were phonetic but concentrated on the signs' metaphorical meanings. Plotinus, in the third century AD, claimed hieroglyphs did not represent words but a divinely inspired, fundamental insight into the nature of the objects they depicted. In the following century Ammianus Marcellinus copied another author's translation of a hieroglyphic text on an obelisk, but the translation was too loose to be useful in understanding the principles of the writing system. The only extensive discussion of hieroglyphs to survive into modern times was the Hieroglyphica, a work probably written in the fourth century AD and attributed to a man named Horapollo. It discusses the meanings of individual hieroglyphs, though not how those signs were used to form phrases or sentences. Some of the meanings it describes are correct, but more are wrong, and all are misleadingly explained as allegories. For instance, Horapollo says an image of a goose means "son" because geese are said to love their children more than other animals. In fact the goose hieroglyph was used because the Egyptian words for "goose" and "son" incorporated the same consonants.

Both hieroglyphic and demotic began to disappear in the third century AD. The temple-based priesthoods died out and Egypt was gradually converted to Christianity, and because Egyptian Christians wrote in the Greek-derived Coptic alphabet, it came to supplant demotic. The last hieroglyphic text was written by priests at the Temple of Isis at Philae in AD 394, and the last known demotic text was inscribed there in AD 452.

Most of history before the first millennium BC was recorded in Egyptian scripts or in cuneiform, the writing system of Mesopotamia. With the loss of knowledge of both these scripts, the only records of the distant past were in limited and distorted sources. The major Egyptian example of such a source was Aegyptiaca, a history of the country written by an Egyptian priest named Manetho in the third century BC. The original text was lost, and it survived only in epitomes and quotations by Roman authors.

The Coptic language, the last form of the Egyptian language, continued to be spoken by most Egyptians well after the Arab conquest of Egypt in AD 642, but it gradually lost ground to Arabic. Coptic began to die out in the twelfth century, and thereafter it survived mainly as the liturgical language of the Coptic Church.

== Early efforts ==
=== Medieval Islamic world ===
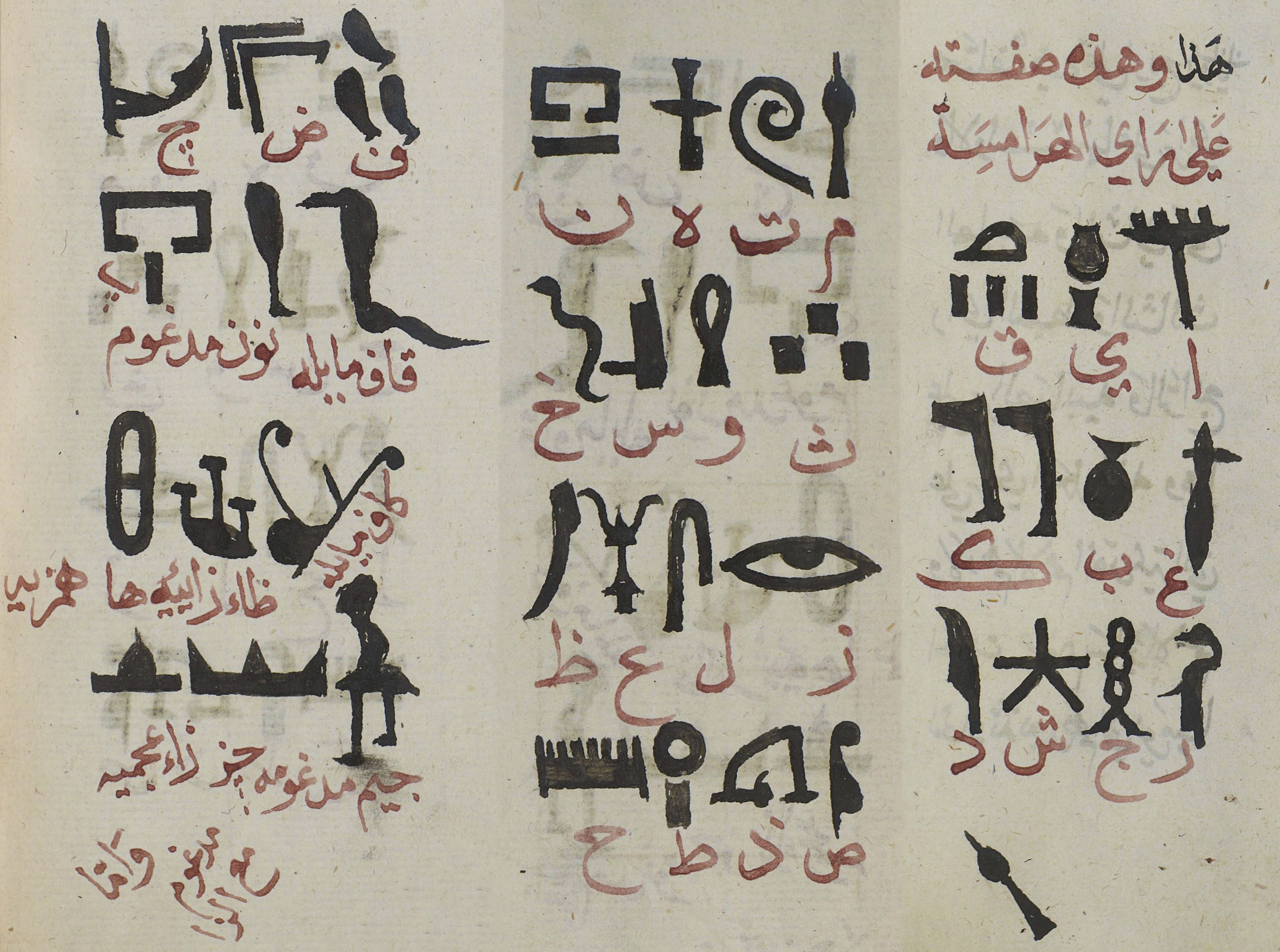
Ibn Wahshiyya's attempted translation of hieroglyphs

Arab scholars were aware of the connection between Coptic and the ancient Egyptian language, and Coptic monks in Islamic times were sometimes believed to understand the ancient scripts. Several Arab scholars in the seventh through fourteenth centuries, including Jabir ibn Hayyan and Ayub ibn Maslama, are said to have understood hieroglyphs, although because their works on the subject have not survived these claims cannot be tested. Dhul-Nun al-Misri and Ibn Wahshiyya, in the ninth and tenth centuries, wrote treatises containing dozens of scripts known in the Islamic world, including hieroglyphs, with tables listing their meanings. In the thirteenth or fourteenth century, Abu al-Qasim al-Iraqi copied an ancient Egyptian text and assigned phonetic values to several hieroglyphs.

The Egyptologist Okasha El-Daly has argued that the tables of hieroglyphs in the works of Ibn Wahshiyya and Abu al-Qasim correctly identified the meaning of many of the signs. Other scholars have been sceptical of Ibn Wahshiyya's claims to understand the scripts he wrote about, and Tara Stephan, a scholar of the medieval Islamic world, says El-Daly "vastly overemphasizes Ibn Waḥshiyya's accuracy". Ibn Wahshiyya and Abu al-Qasim did recognise that hieroglyphs could function phonetically as well as symbolically, a point that would not be acknowledged in Europe for centuries.

=== Fifteenth through seventeenth centuries ===
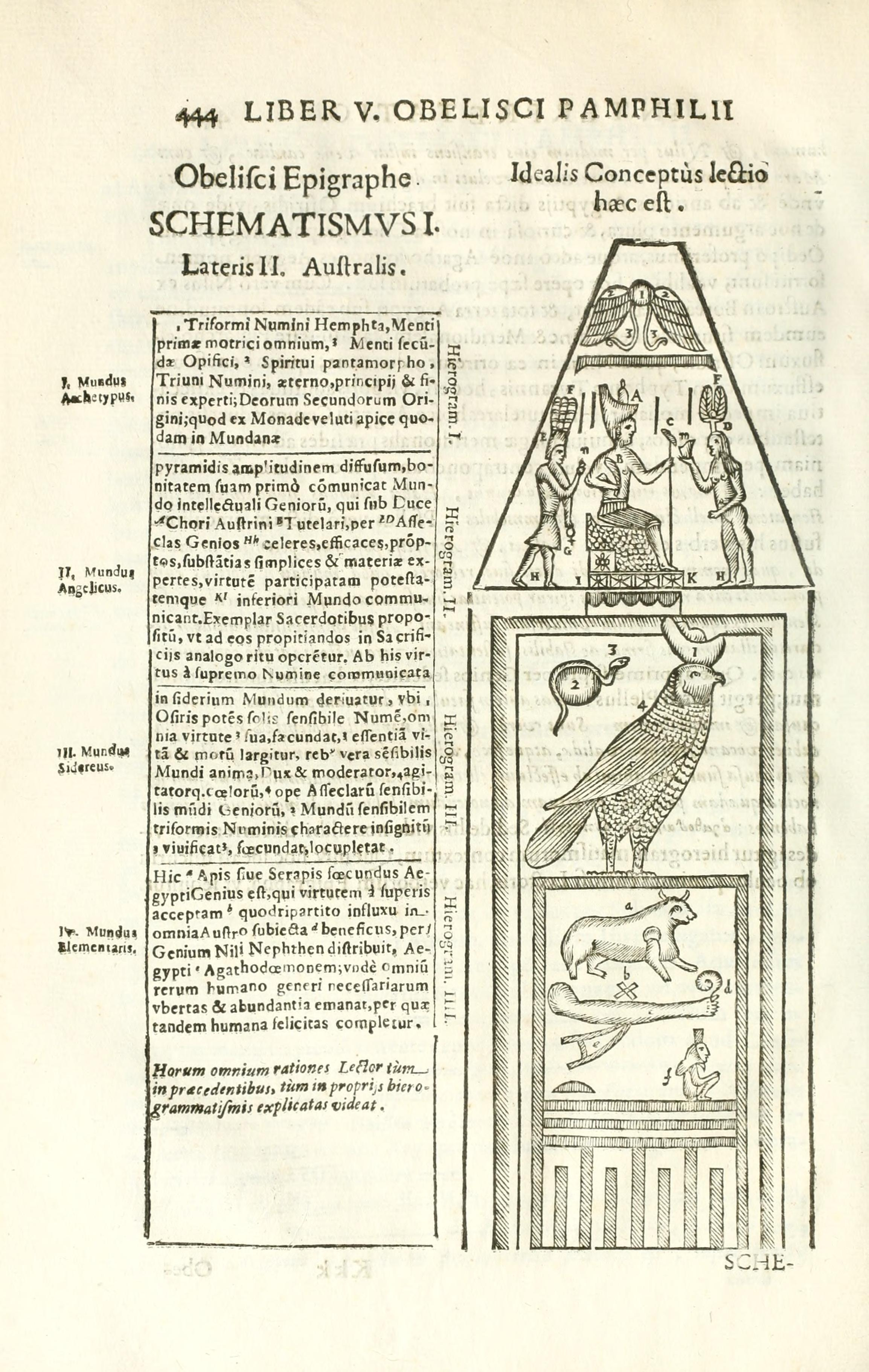
A page from Athanasius Kircher's Obeliscus Pamphilius (1650), with fanciful translations given for the figures and hieroglyphs on an obelisk in Rome

During the Renaissance Europeans became interested in hieroglyphs, beginning around 1422 when Cristoforo Buondelmonti discovered a copy of Horapollo's Hieroglyphica in Greece and brought it to the attention of antiquarians such as Niccolò de' Niccoli and Poggio Bracciolini. Poggio recognised that there were hieroglyphic texts on obelisks and other Egyptian artefacts imported to Europe in Roman times, but the antiquarians did not attempt to decipher these texts. Influenced by Horapollo and Plotinus, they saw hieroglyphs as a universal, image-based form of communication, not a means of recording a spoken language. From this belief sprang a Renaissance artistic tradition of using obscure symbolism loosely based on the imagery described in Horapollo, pioneered by Francesco Colonna's 1499 book Hypnerotomachia Poliphili.

Europeans were ignorant of Coptic as well. Scholars sometimes obtained Coptic manuscripts, but in the sixteenth century, when they began to seriously study the language, the ability to read it may have been limited to Coptic monks, and no Europeans of the time had the opportunity to learn from one of these monks, who did not travel outside Egypt. (Note: Written Coptic was not used to compose new texts after the fourteenth century, whereas copying of texts by monks continued down to the nineteenth century. Use of Coptic outside church ritual may have lasted in some Upper Egyptian communities into the twentieth century.) Scholars were also unsure whether Coptic was descended from the language of the ancient Egyptians; many thought it was instead related to other languages of the ancient Near East.

The first European to make sense of Coptic was a German Jesuit and polymath, Athanasius Kircher, in the mid-seventeenth century. Basing his work on Arabic grammars and dictionaries of Coptic acquired in Egypt by an Italian traveller, Pietro Della Valle, Kircher produced flawed but pioneering translations and grammars of the language in the 1630s and 1640s. He guessed that Coptic was derived from the language of the ancient Egyptians, and his work on the subject was preparation for his ultimate goal, decipherment of the hieroglyphic script.

According to the standard biographical dictionary of Egyptology, "Kircher has become, perhaps unfairly, the symbol of all that is absurd and fantastic in the story of the decipherment of Egyptian hieroglyphs". Kircher thought the Egyptians had believed in an ancient theological tradition that preceded and foreshadowed Christianity, and he hoped to understand this tradition through hieroglyphs. Like his Renaissance predecessors, he believed hieroglyphs represented an abstract form of communication rather than a language. To translate such a system of communication in a self-consistent way was impossible. Therefore, in his works on hieroglyphs, such as Oedipus Aegyptiacus (1652–1655), Kircher proceeded by guesswork based on his understanding of ancient Egyptian beliefs, derived from the Coptic texts he had read and from ancient texts that he thought contained traditions derived from Egypt. His translations turned short texts containing only a few hieroglyphic characters into lengthy sentences of esoteric ideas. Unlike earlier European scholars, Kircher did realise that hieroglyphs could function phonetically, though he considered this function a late development. He also recognised one hieroglyph, 𓈗, as representing water and thus standing phonetically for the Coptic word for water, mu, as well as the m sound. He became the first European to correctly identify a phonetic value for a hieroglyph.

Although Kircher's basic assumptions were shared by his contemporaries, most scholars rejected or even ridiculed his translations. Nevertheless, his argument that Coptic was derived from the ancient Egyptian language was widely accepted.

=== Eighteenth century ===
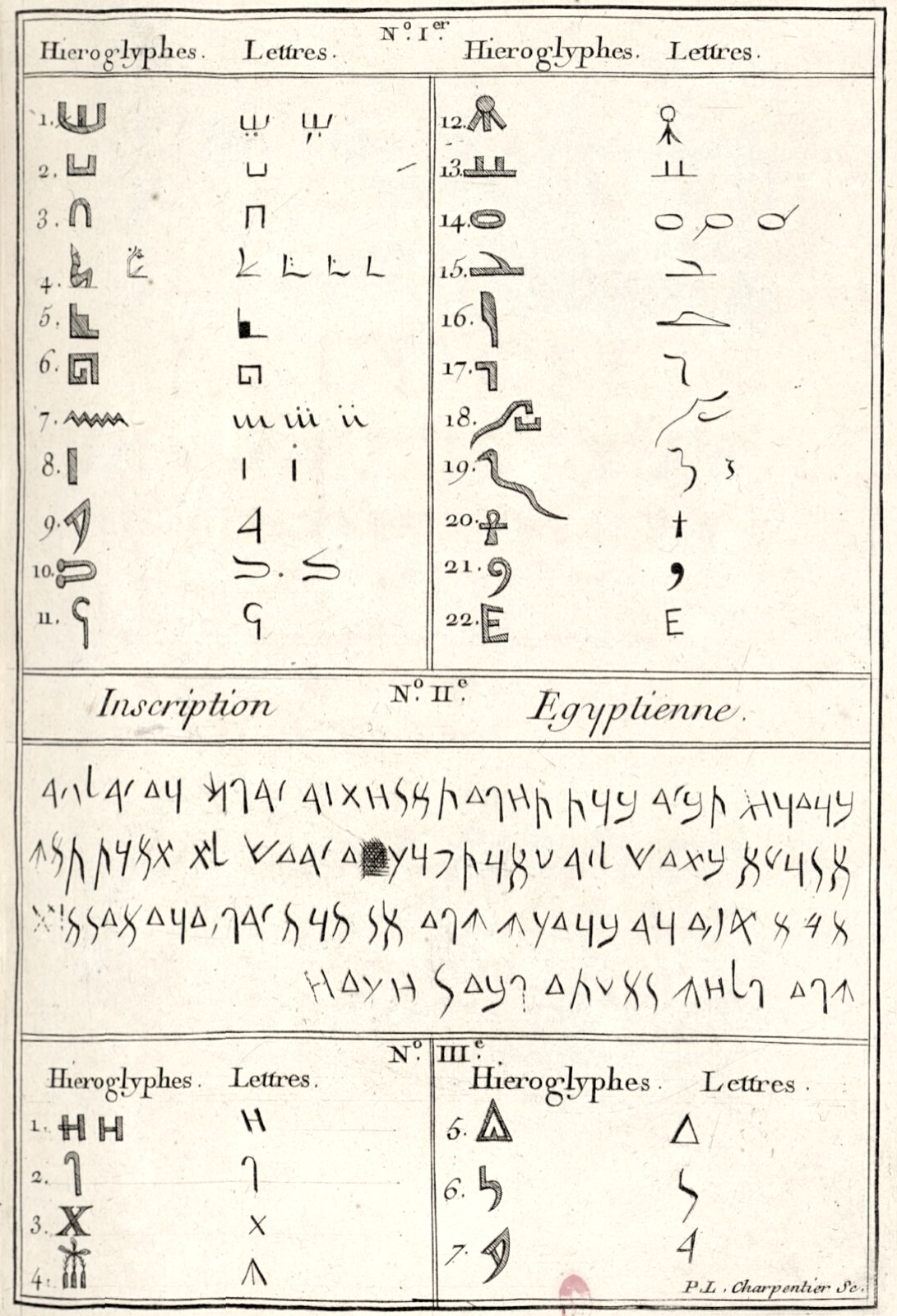
Page from Recueil d'antiquités égyptiennes by Anne Claude de Caylus, 1752, comparing hieroglyphs to demotic script (No1), and to what is now known to be Aramaic in the Phoenician alphabet (No2, No3) from the Carpentras Stele.

Hardly anyone attempted to decipher hieroglyphs for decades after Kircher's last works on the subject, although some contributed suggestions about the script that ultimately proved correct. William Warburton's religious treatise The Divine Legation of Moses, published from 1738 to 1741, included a long digression on hieroglyphs and the evolution of writing. It argued that hieroglyphs were not invented to encode religious secrets but for practical purposes, like any other writing system, and that the phonetic Egyptian script mentioned by Clement of Alexandria was derived from them. Warburton's approach, though purely theoretical, created the framework for understanding hieroglyphs that would dominate scholarship for the rest of the century.

Europeans' contact with Egypt increased during the eighteenth century. More of them visited the country and saw its ancient inscriptions firsthand, and as they collected antiquities, the number of texts available for study increased. Jean-Pierre Rigord became the first European to identify a non-hieroglyphic ancient Egyptian text in 1704, and Bernard de Montfaucon published a large collection of such texts in 1724. Anne Claude de Caylus collected and published a large number of Egyptian inscriptions from 1752 to 1767, assisted by Jean-Jacques Barthélemy. Their work noted that non-hieroglyphic Egyptian scripts seemed to contain signs derived from hieroglyphs. Barthélemy also pointed out the oval rings, later to be known as cartouches, that enclosed small groups of signs in many hieroglyphic texts, and in 1762 he suggested that cartouches contained the names of kings or gods. Carsten Niebuhr, who visited Egypt in the 1760s, produced the first systematic, though incomplete, list of distinct hieroglyphic signs. He also pointed out the distinction between hieroglyphic text and the illustrations that accompanied it, whereas earlier scholars had confused the two. Joseph de Guignes, one of several scholars of the time who speculated that Chinese culture had some historical connection to ancient Egypt, believed Chinese writing was an offshoot of hieroglyphs. In 1785 he repeated Barthélémy's suggestion about cartouches, comparing it with a Chinese practice that set proper names apart from the surrounding text.

Jørgen Zoëga, the most knowledgeable scholar of Coptic in the late eighteenth century, made several insights about hieroglyphs in De origine et usu obeliscorum (1797), a compendium of knowledge about ancient Egypt. He catalogued hieroglyphic signs and concluded that there were too few distinct signs for each one to represent a single word, so to produce a full vocabulary they must have each had multiple meanings or changed meaning by combining with each other. He saw that the direction the signs faced indicated the direction in which a text was meant to be read, and he suggested that some signs were phonetic. Zoëga did not attempt to decipher the script, believing that doing so would require more evidence than was available in Europe at the time.

== Identifying signs ==
=== Rosetta Stone ===
A reconstruction of the Rosetta Stone stela as it may have originally appeared, with all three registers intact

When French forces under Napoleon Bonaparte invaded Egypt in 1798, Bonaparte brought with him a corps of scientists and scholars, generally known as the savants, to study the land and its ancient monuments. In July 1799, when French soldiers were rebuilding a Mamluk fort near the town of Rosetta that they had dubbed Fort Julien, Lieutenant Pierre-François Bouchard noticed that one of the stones from a demolished wall in the fort was covered with writing. It was an ancient Egyptian stela, divided into three registers of text, with its lower right corner and most of its upper register broken off. The stone was inscribed with three scripts: hieroglyphs in the top register, Greek at the bottom and demotic in the middle. The text was a decree issued in 197 BC by Ptolemy V, granting favours to Egypt's priesthoods. The text ended by calling for copies of the decree to be inscribed "in sacred, and native, and Greek characters" and set up in Egypt's major temples. Upon reading this passage in the Greek inscription the French realised the stone was a parallel text, which could allow the Egyptian text to be deciphered based on its Greek translation. The savants eagerly sought other fragments of the stela as well as other texts in Greek and Egyptian. No further pieces of the stone were ever found, and the only other bilingual texts the savants discovered were largely illegible and useless for decipherment.

The savants did make some progress with the stone itself. Jean-Joseph Marcel said the middle script was "cursive characters of the ancient Egyptian language", identical to others he had seen on papyrus scrolls. He and Louis Rémi Raige began comparing the text of this register with the Greek one, reasoning that the middle register would be more fruitful than the hieroglyphic text, most of which was missing. They guessed at the positions of proper names in the middle register, based on the position of those names in the Greek text, and managed to identify the p and t in the name of Ptolemy, but they made no further progress.

The first copies of the stone's inscriptions were sent to France in 1800. In 1801 the French army in Egypt was besieged by British and Ottoman forces and surrendered in the Capitulation of Alexandria. By its terms, the Rosetta Stone passed to the British. Upon the stone's arrival in Britain, the Society of Antiquaries of London made engravings of its text and sent them to academic institutions across Europe.

Reports from Napoleon's expedition spurred a mania for ancient Egypt in Europe. Egypt was chaotic in the wake of the French and British withdrawal, but after Muhammad Ali took control of the country in 1805, European collectors descended on Egypt and carried away numerous antiquities, while artists copied others. No one knew these artefacts' historical context, but they contributed to the corpus of texts that scholars could compare when trying to decipher the writing systems.

=== De Sacy, Åkerblad and Young ===
Antoine-Isaac Silvestre de Sacy, a prominent French linguist who had deciphered the Persian Pahlavi script in 1787, was among the first to work on the stone. Like Marcel and Raige he concentrated on relating the Greek text to the demotic script in the middle register. Based on Plutarch he assumed this script consisted of 25 phonetic signs. De Sacy looked for Greek proper names within the demotic text and attempted to identify the phonetic signs within them, but beyond identifying the names of Ptolemy, Alexander and Arsinoe he made little progress. He realised that there were far more than 25 signs in demotic and that the demotic inscription was probably not a close translation of the Greek one, thus making the task more difficult. After publishing his results in 1802 he ceased working on the stone.

In the same year de Sacy gave a copy of the stone's inscriptions to a former student of his, Johan David Åkerblad, a Swedish diplomat and amateur linguist. Åkerblad had greater success, analysing the same sign-groups as de Sacy but identifying more signs correctly. In his letters to de Sacy Åkerblad proposed an alphabet of 29 demotic signs, half of which were later proven correct, and based on his knowledge of Coptic identified several demotic words within the text. De Sacy was sceptical of his results, and Åkerblad too gave up. Despite attempts by other scholars, little further progress was made until more than a decade later, when Thomas Young entered the field.

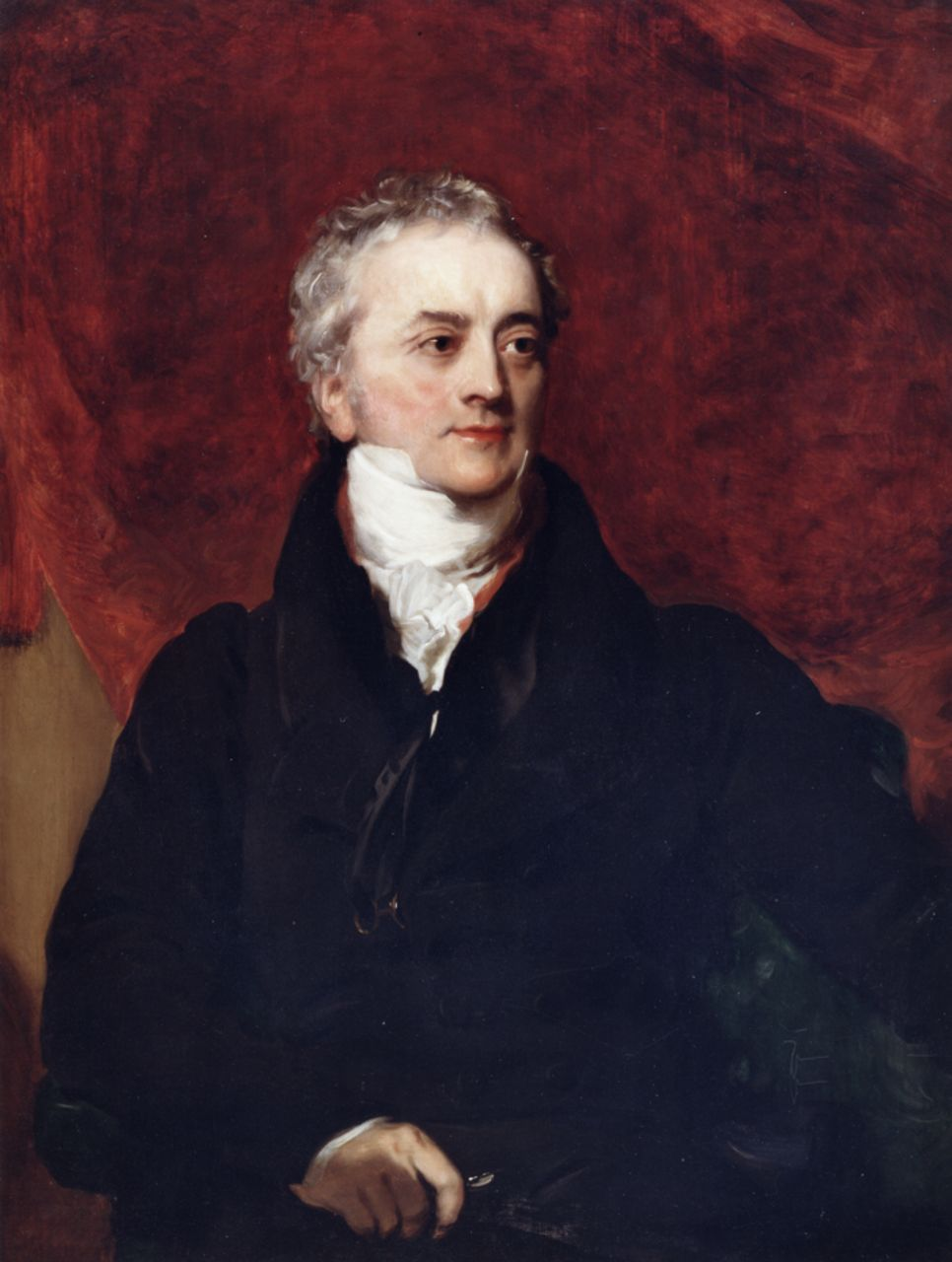
Portrait of Thomas Young in 1822, by Henry Perronet Briggs

Young was a British polymath whose fields of expertise included physics, medicine and linguistics. By the time he turned his attention to Egypt he was regarded as one of the foremost intellectuals of the day. In 1814 he began corresponding with de Sacy about the Rosetta Stone, and after some months he produced what he called translations of the hieroglyphic and demotic texts of the stone. They were in fact attempts to break the texts down into groups of signs to find areas where the Egyptian text was most likely to closely match the Greek. This approach was of limited use because the three texts were not exact translations of each other. Young spent months copying other Egyptian texts, which enabled him to see patterns in them that others missed. Like Zoëga, he recognised that there were too few hieroglyphs for each to represent one word, and he suggested that words were composed of two or three hieroglyphs each.

Young noticed the similarities between hieroglyphic and demotic signs and concluded that the hieroglyphic signs had evolved into the demotic ones. If so, Young reasoned, demotic could not be a purely phonetic script but must also include ideographic signs that were derived from hieroglyphs; he wrote to de Sacy with this insight in 1815. (Note: Young and other scholars recognised that hieratic represented an intermediate stage between hieroglyphic and demotic, but its exact nature, and whether it should be regarded as a distinct script from demotic, remained disputed throughout the period in which Young and Champollion were working.) Although he hoped to find phonetic signs in the hieroglyphic script, he was thwarted by the wide variety of phonetic spellings the script used. He concluded that phonetic hieroglyphs did not exist—with a major exception. In his 1802 publication de Sacy had said hieroglyphs might function phonetically when writing foreign words. In 1811 he suggested, after learning about a similar practice in Chinese writing, that a cartouche signified a word written phonetically—such as the name of a non-Egyptian ruler like Ptolemy. Young applied these suggestions to the cartouches on the Rosetta Stone. Some were short, consisting of eight signs, while others contained those same signs followed by many more. Young guessed that the long cartouches contained the Egyptian form of the title given to Ptolemy in the Greek inscription: "living for ever, beloved of [the god] Ptah". Therefore, he concentrated on the first eight signs, which should correspond to the Greek form of the name, Ptolemaios. Adopting some of the phonetic values proposed by Åkerblad, Young matched the eight hieroglyphs to their demotic equivalents and proposed that some signs represented several phonetic values while others stood for just one. He then attempted to apply the results to a cartouche of Berenice, the name of a Ptolemaic queen, with less success, although he did identify a pair of hieroglyphs that marked the ending of a feminine name. The result was a set of thirteen phonetic values for hieroglyphic and demotic signs. Six were correct, three partly correct, and four wrong.

Young's analysis of the cartouche of Ptolemy
p t wA l M i i s
Hieroglyph	p	t	wA	l	M	i i	s
Young's reading	P	T	inessential	LO or OLE	MA or M	I	OSH or OS

Young summarised his work in his article "Egypt", published anonymously in a supplement to the Encyclopædia Britannica in 1819. It gave conjectural translations for 218 words in demotic and 200 in hieroglyphic and correctly correlated about 80 hieroglyphic signs with demotic equivalents. As the Egyptologist Francis Llewellyn Griffith put it in 1922, Young's results were "mixed up with many false conclusions, but the method pursued was infallibly leading to definite decipherment." Yet Young was less interested in ancient Egyptian texts themselves than in the writing systems as an intellectual puzzle, and his multiple scientific interests made it difficult for him to concentrate on decipherment. He achieved little more on the subject in the next few years.

=== Champollion's breakthroughs ===
Jean-François Champollion had developed a fascination with ancient Egypt in adolescence, between about 1803 and 1805, and he had studied Near Eastern languages, including Coptic, under de Sacy and others. His brother, Jacques Joseph Champollion-Figeac, was an assistant to Bon-Joseph Dacier, the head of the Académie des Inscriptions et Belles-Lettres in Paris, and in that position provided Jean-François with the means to keep up with research on Egypt. By the time Young was working on hieroglyphs Champollion had published a compendium of the established knowledge on ancient Egypt and assembled a Coptic dictionary, but though he wrote much on the subject of the undeciphered scripts, he was making no progress with them. As late as 1821 he believed that none of the scripts were phonetic. In the following years, however, he surged ahead. The details of how he did so cannot be fully determined because of gaps in the evidence and conflicts in the contemporary accounts.

Champollion was initially dismissive of Young's work, having seen only excerpts from Young's list of hieroglyphic and demotic words. After moving to Paris from Grenoble in mid-1821 he would have been able to obtain a full copy, but it is not known whether he did so. It was about this time that he turned his attention to identifying phonetic sounds within cartouches.

A crucial clue came from the Philae Obelisk, an obelisk bearing both a Greek and an Egyptian inscription. William John Bankes, an English antiquities collector, shipped the obelisk from Egypt to England and copied its inscriptions. These inscriptions were not a single bilingual text like that of the Rosetta Stone, as Bankes assumed, but both inscriptions contained the names "Ptolemy" and "Cleopatra", the hieroglyphic versions being enclosed by cartouches. The Ptolemy cartouche was identifiable based on the Rosetta Stone, but Bankes could only guess based on the Greek text that the second represented Cleopatra's name. His copy of the text suggested this reading of the cartouche in pencil. Champollion, who saw the copy in January 1822, treated the cartouche as that of Cleopatra but never stated how he identified it; he could have done so in more than one way, given the evidence available to him. Bankes angrily assumed Champollion had taken his suggestion without giving credit and refused to give him any further help.

Champollion broke down the hieroglyphs in Ptolemy's name differently from Young and found that three of his conjectured phonetic signs—p, l and o—fitted into Cleopatra's cartouche. A fourth, e, was represented by a single hieroglyph in Cleopatra's cartouche and a doubled version of the same glyph in Ptolemy's cartouche. A fifth sound, t, seemed to be written with different signs in each cartouche, but Champollion decided these signs must be homophones, different signs spelling the same sound. He proceeded to test these letters in other cartouches, identifying the names of many Greek and Roman rulers of Egypt and extrapolating the values of more letters still.

Champollion's analysis of the cartouche of Ptolemy
p t wA l M i i s
Hieroglyph	p	t	wA	l	M	i i	s
Champollion's reading	P	T	O	L	M	E	S

Champollion's analysis of the cartouche of Cleopatra
q l i wA p A d r A t H8
Hieroglyph	q	l	i	wA	p	A	d	r	A	t H8
Champollion's reading	K	L	E	O	P	A	T	R	A	Feminine ending

In July Champollion rebutted an analysis by Jean-Baptiste Biot of the text surrounding an Egyptian temple relief known as the Dendera Zodiac. In doing so he pointed out that hieroglyphs of stars in this text seemed to indicate that the nearby words referred to something related to stars, such as constellations. He called the signs used in this way "signs of the type", although he would later dub them "determinatives".

Champollion announced his proposed readings of the Greco-Roman cartouches in his Lettre à M. Dacier, which he completed on 22 September 1822. He read it to the Académie on 27 September, with Young among the audience. This letter is often regarded as the founding document of Egyptology, although it represented only a modest advance over Young's work. Yet it ended by suggesting, without elaboration, that phonetic signs might have been used in writing proper names from a very early point in Egyptian history. How Champollion reached this conclusion is mostly not recorded in contemporary sources. His own writings suggest that one of the keys was his conclusion that the Abydos King List contained the name "Ramesses", a royal name found in the works of Manetho, and that some of his other evidence came from copies of inscriptions in Egypt made by Jean-Nicolas Huyot.

ra ms s s
Ramesses
in hieroglyphs

G26 ms s
Thutmose
in hieroglyphs

According to Hermine Hartleben, who wrote the most extensive biography of Champollion in 1906, the breakthrough came on 14 September 1822, a few days before the Lettre was written, when Champollion was examining Huyot's copies. One cartouche from Abu Simbel contained four hieroglyphic signs. Champollion guessed, or drew on the same guess found in Young's Britannica article, that the circular first sign represented the sun. The Coptic word for "sun" was re. The sign that appeared twice at the end of the cartouche stood for "s" in the cartouche of Ptolemy. If the name in the cartouche began with Re and ended with ss, it might thus match "Ramesses", suggesting the sign in the middle stood for m. Further confirmation came from the Rosetta Stone, where the m and s signs appeared together at a point corresponding to the word for "birth" in the Greek text, and from Coptic, in which the word for "birth" was mise. Another cartouche contained three signs, two of them the same as in the Ramesses cartouche. The first sign, an ibis, was a known symbol of the god Thoth. If the latter two signs had the same values as in the Ramesses cartouche, the name in the second cartouche would be Thothmes, corresponding to the royal name "Tuthmosis" mentioned by Manetho. These were native Egyptian kings, well predating Greek rule in Egypt, yet the writing of their names was partially phonetic. Now Champollion turned to the title of Ptolemy found in the longer cartouches in the Rosetta Stone. Champollion knew the Coptic words that would translate the Greek text and could tell that phonetic hieroglyphs such as p and t would fit these words. From there he could guess the phonetic meanings of several more signs. By Hartleben's account, upon making these discoveries Champollion raced to his brother's office at the Académie des Inscriptions, flung down a collection of copied inscriptions, cried "Je tiens mon affaire! " ("I've done it!") and collapsed in a days-long faint. (Note: The earliest version of the story of Champollion's exclamation and fainting comes from an account written by an author named Adolphe Rochas in 1856, according to which Champollion was working on notes for the Lettre when it took place. Jacques-Joseph Champollion-Figeac's son, Aimé, repeated Rochas's account several years later, and Jacques-Joseph may have been the source for both. Hartleben's account is the earliest to connect the event to Huyot's inscription copies.)

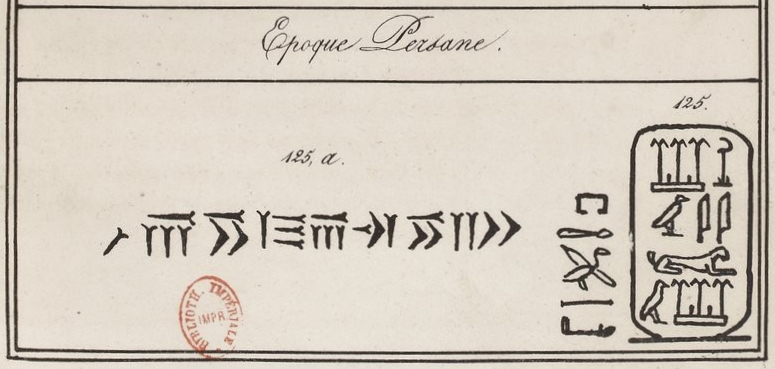
Hieroglyphic and cuneiform spellings of the name of Xerxes I on the Caylus vase, copied in Précis du système hiéroglyphique

Over the next few months Champollion applied his hieroglyphic alphabet to many Egyptian inscriptions, identifying dozens of royal names and titles. During this period Champollion and the orientalist Antoine-Jean Saint-Martin examined the Caylus vase, which bore a hieroglyphic cartouche as well as text in Persian cuneiform. Saint-Martin, based on the earlier work of Georg Friedrich Grotefend, believed the cuneiform text to bear the name of Xerxes I, a king of the Achaemenid Empire in the fifth century BC whose realm included Egypt. Champollion confirmed that the identifiable signs in the cartouche matched Xerxes's name, strengthening the evidence that phonetic hieroglyphs were used long before Greek rule in Egypt and supporting Saint-Martin's reading of the cuneiform text. This was a major step in the decipherment of cuneiform.

Around this time Champollion made a second breakthrough. Although he counted about 860 hieroglyphic signs, a handful of those signs made up a large proportion of any given text. He also came upon a recent study of Chinese by Abel Rémusat, which showed that even Chinese writing used phonetic characters extensively, and that its ideographic signs had to be combined into many ligatures to form a full vocabulary. Few hieroglyphs seemed to be ligatures. Champollion had identified the name of Antinous, a non-royal Roman, written in hieroglyphs with no cartouche, next to characters that seemed to be ideographic. Phonetic signs were thus not limited to cartouches. To test his suspicions, Champollion compared hieroglyphic texts that seemed to contain the same content and noted discrepancies in spelling, which indicated the presence of homophones. He compared the resulting list of homophones with the table of phonetic signs from his work on the cartouches and found they matched. (Note: Hartleben said that according to an established "tradition" Champollion came to this realisation on his birthday, 23 December 1821. Andrew Robinson, author of a more recent biography, argues that this date is too early, given that the Lettre à M. Dacier, written the following September, gives no indication that hieroglyphs were used phonetically outside the cartouches. Robinson suggests Champollion might instead have realised the extent of phoneticism in December 1822, when his work was more advanced. Jed Z. Buchwald and Diance Greco Josefowicz argue that there is no sign in the primary documents that the breakthrough came earlier than March 1823.)

Champollion announced these discoveries to the Académie des Inscriptions in April 1823. From there he progressed rapidly in identifying new signs and words. He concluded the phonetic signs made up a consonantal alphabet in which vowels were only sometimes written. A summary of his findings, published in 1824 as Précis du système hiéroglyphique, stated "Hieroglyphic writing is a complex system, a script all at once figurative, symbolic and phonetic, in one and the same text, in one and the same sentence, and, I might even venture, one and the same word." The Précis identified hundreds of hieroglyphic words, described differences between hieroglyphs and other scripts, analysed proper names and the uses of cartouches and described some of the language's grammar. Champollion was moving from deciphering a script to translating the underlying language.

=== Disputes ===
The Lettre à M. Dacier mentioned Young as having worked on demotic and referred to Young's attempt to decipher the name of Berenice, but it did not mention Young's breakdown of Ptolemy's name nor that the feminine name-ending, which was also found in Cleopatra's name on the Philae Obelisk, had been Young's discovery. Believing that these discoveries had made Champollion's progress possible, Young expected to receive much of the credit for whatever Champollion ultimately produced. In private correspondence shortly after the reading of the Lettre, Young quoted a French saying that meant "It's the first step that counts", although he also said "if [Champollion] did borrow an English key, the lock was so dreadfully rusty, that no common arm would have strength enough to turn it".

In 1823 Young published a book on his Egyptian work, An Account of Some Recent Discoveries in Hieroglyphical Literature and Egyptian Antiquities, and responded to Champollion's slight in the subtitle: "Including the Author's Original Hieroglyphic Alphabet, As Extended by Mr Champollion". Champollion angrily responded, "I shall never consent to recognise any other original alphabet than my own, where it is a matter of the hieroglyphic alphabet properly called". The Précis in the following year acknowledged Young's work, but in it Champollion said he had arrived at his conclusions independently, without seeing Young's Britannica article. Scholarly opinion ever since has been divided on whether Champollion was being truthful. Young would continue to push for greater acknowledgement, while expressing a mixture of admiration of Champollion's work and scepticism of some of his conclusions. Relations between them varied between cordial and contentious until Young's death in 1829.

As he continued to work on hieroglyphs, making mistakes alongside many successes, Champollion was embroiled in a related dispute, with scholars who rejected the validity of his work. Among them were Edme Jomard, a veteran of Napoleon's expedition, and Heinrich Julius Klaproth, a German orientalist. Some championed Young at the same time. The scholar who held out longest against Champollion's decipherment was Gustav Seyffarth. His opposition to Champollion culminated in a public argument with him in 1826, and he continued to advocate his own approach to hieroglyphs until his death in 1885.

As the nature of hieroglyphs became clearer, detractors of this kind fell away, but the debate over how much Champollion owed to Young continues. Nationalist rivalry between the English and French exacerbates the issue. Egyptologists are often reluctant to criticise Champollion, who is regarded as the founder of their discipline, and by extension can be reluctant to credit Young. The Egyptologist Richard Parkinson takes a moderate position: "Even if one allows that Champollion was more familiar with Young's initial work than he subsequently claimed, he remains the decipherer of the hieroglyphic script… Young discovered parts of an alphabet—a key—but Champollion unlocked an entire language."

== Reading texts ==
=== Young and demotic ===
Young's work on hieroglyphs petered out during the 1820s, but his work on demotic continued, aided by a fortuitous discovery. One of his sources for studying the script was a text in a collection known as the Casati papyri; Young had identified several Greek names in this text. In November 1822 an acquaintance of his, George Francis Grey, loaned him a box of Greek papyri found in Egypt. Upon examining them Young realised that one contained the same names as the demotic Casati text. The two texts were versions of the same document, in Greek and demotic, recording the sale of a portion of the offerings made on behalf of a group of deceased Egyptians. Young had long tried to obtain a second bilingual text to supplement the Rosetta Stone. With these texts in hand, he made major progress over the next few years. In the mid-1820s he was diverted by his other interests, but in 1827 he was spurred by a letter from an Italian scholar of Coptic, Amedeo Peyron, that said Young's habit of moving from one subject to another hampered his achievements and suggested he could accomplish much more if he concentrated on ancient Egypt. Young spent the last two years of his life working on demotic. At one point he consulted Champollion, then a curator at the Louvre, who treated him amicably, gave him access to his notes about demotic and spent hours showing him the demotic texts in the Louvre's collection. Young's Rudiments of an Egyptian Dictionary in the Ancient Enchorial Character was published posthumously in 1831. It included a full translation of one text and large portions of the text of the Rosetta Stone. According to the Egyptologist John Ray, Young "probably deserves to be known as the decipherer of demotic."

=== Champollion's last years ===
By 1824 the Rosetta Stone, with its limited hieroglyphic text, had become irrelevant for further progress on hieroglyphs. Champollion needed more texts to study, and few were available in France. From 1824 through 1826 he made two visits to Italy and studied the Egyptian antiquities found there, particularly those recently shipped from Egypt to the Egyptian Museum in Turin. By reading the inscriptions on dozens of statues and stelae, Champollion became the first person in centuries to identify the kings who had commissioned them, although in some cases his identifications were incorrect. He also looked at the museum's papyri and was able to discern their subject matter. Of particular interest was the Turin King List, a papyrus listing Egyptian rulers and the lengths of their reigns up to the thirteenth century BC, which would eventually furnish a framework for the chronology of Egyptian history but lay in pieces when Champollion saw it. While in Italy Champollion befriended Ippolito Rosellini, a Pisan linguist who was swept up in Champollion's fervour for ancient Egypt and began studying with him. Champollion also worked on assembling a collection of Egyptian antiquities at the Louvre, including the texts he would later show to Young. In 1827 he published a revised edition of the Précis that included some of his recent findings.

Antiquarians living in Egypt, especially John Gardner Wilkinson, were already applying Champollion's findings to the texts there. Champollion and Rosellini wanted to do so themselves, and together with some other scholars and artists they formed the Franco-Tuscan Expedition to Egypt. En route to Egypt Champollion stopped to look at a papyrus in the hands of a French antiquities dealer. It was a copy of the Instructions of King Amenemhat, a work of wisdom literature cast as posthumous advice from Amenemhat I to his son and successor. It became the first work of ancient Egyptian literature to be read, although Champollion could not read it well enough to fully understand what it was. In 1828 and 1829 the expedition travelled the length of the Egyptian course of the Nile, copying and collecting antiquities. After studying countless texts Champollion felt certain that his system was applicable to hieroglyphic texts from every period of Egyptian history, and he apparently coined the term "determinative" while there.

After returning from Egypt, Champollion spent much of his time working on a full description of the Egyptian language, but he had little time to complete it. Beginning in late 1831 he suffered a series of increasingly debilitating strokes, and he died in March 1832.

=== Mid-nineteenth century ===
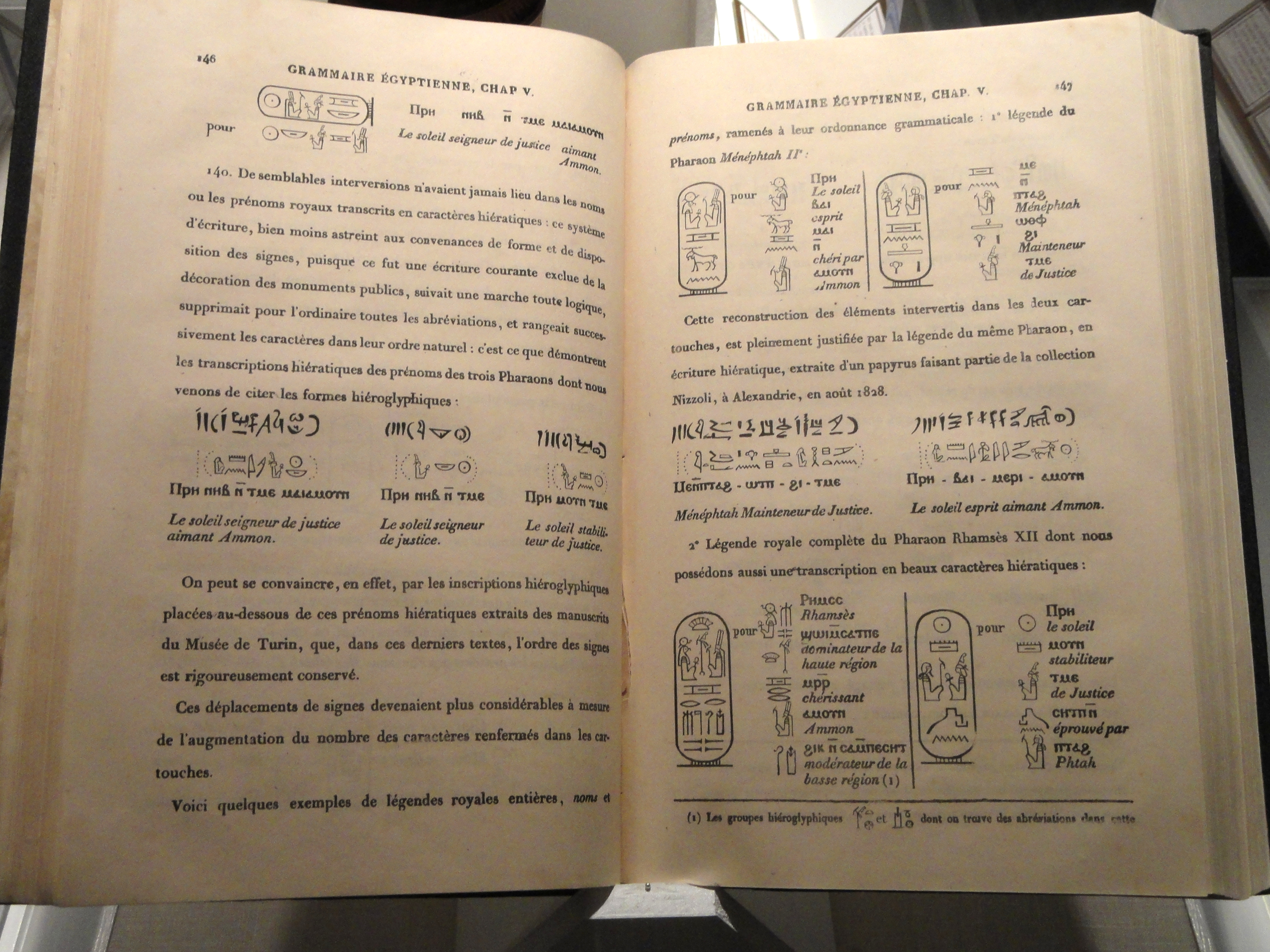
Champollion's Grammaire égyptienne

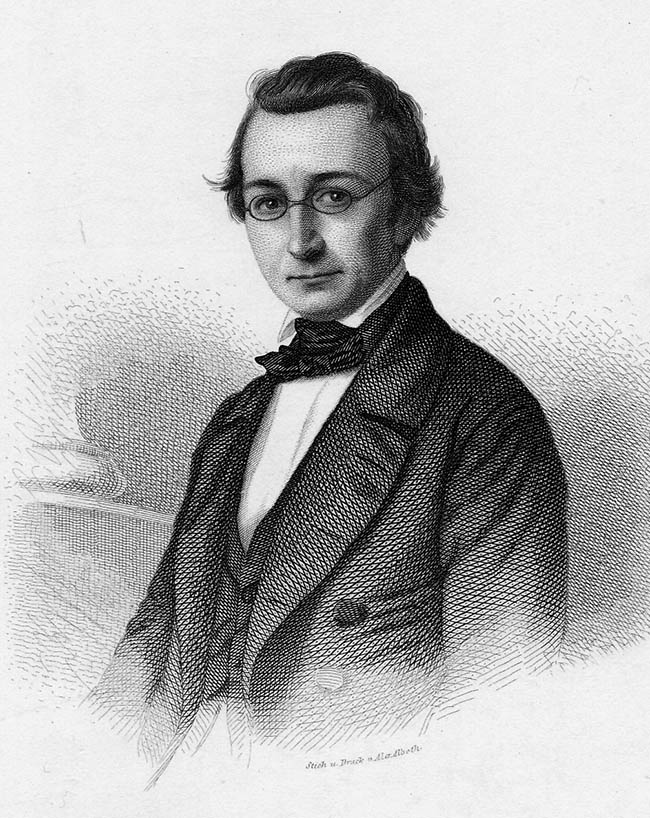
Portrait of Karl Richard Lepsius around 1850, by Alexander Alboth

Champollion-Figeac published his brother's grammar of Egyptian and an accompanying dictionary in instalments from 1836 to 1843. Both were incomplete, especially the dictionary, which was confusingly organised and contained many conjectural translations. These works' deficiencies reflected the incomplete state of understanding of Egyptian upon Champollion's death. Champollion often went astray by overestimating the similarity between classical Egyptian and Coptic. As Griffith put it in 1922, "In reality Coptic is a remote derivative from ancient Egyptian, like French from Latin; in some cases, therefore, Champollion's provisional transcripts produced good Coptic words, while mostly they were more or less meaningless or impossible, and in transcribing phrases either Coptic syntax was hopelessly violated or the order of hieroglyphic words had to be inverted. This was all very baffling and misleading." Champollion was also unaware that signs could spell two or three consonants as well as one. Instead he thought every phonetic sign represented one sound and each sound had a great many homophones. Thus the middle sign in the cartouches of Ramesses and Thutmose was biliteral, representing the consonant sequence ms, but Champollion read it as m. Neither had he struck upon the concept now known as a "phonetic complement": a uniliteral sign that was added at the end of a word, re-spelling a sound that had already been written out in a different way.

Most of Champollion's collaborators lacked the linguistic abilities needed to advance the decipherment process, and many of them died early deaths. Edward Hincks, an Irish clergyman whose primary interest was the decipherment of cuneiform, made important contributions in the 1830s and 1840s. Whereas Champollion's translations of texts had filled in gaps in his knowledge with informed guesswork, Hincks tried to proceed more systematically. He identified grammatical elements in Egyptian, such as particles and auxiliary verbs, that did not exist in Coptic, and he argued that the sounds of the Egyptian language were similar to those of Semitic languages. Hincks also improved the understanding of hieratic, which had been neglected in Egyptological studies thus far.

The scholar who corrected the most fundamental faults in Champollion's work was Karl Richard Lepsius, a Prussian philologist who began studying the Egyptian language using Champollion's grammar. He struck up a friendship with Rosellini and began corresponding with him about the language. Lepsius's Lettre à M. le Professeur H. Rosellini sur l'Alphabet hiéroglyphique, which he published in 1837, explained the functions of biliteral signs, triliteral signs and phonetic complements, although those terms had not yet been coined. It listed 30 uniliteral signs, compared with more than 200 in Champollion's system and 24 in the modern understanding of the hieroglyphic script. Lepsius's letter greatly strengthened the case for Champollion's general approach to hieroglyphs while correcting its deficiencies, and it definitively moved the focus of Egyptology from decipherment to translation. Champollion, Rosellini and Lepsius are often considered the founders of Egyptology; Young is sometimes included as well.

Lepsius was one of a new generation of Egyptologists who emerged in the mid-nineteenth century. Emmanuel de Rougé, who began studying Egyptian in 1839, was the first person to translate a full-length ancient Egyptian text; he published the first translations of Egyptian literary texts in 1856. In the words of one of de Rougé's students, Gaston Maspero, "de Rougé gave us the method which allowed us to utilise and bring to perfection the method of Champollion". Other scholars concentrated on the lesser-known scripts. Heinrich Brugsch was the first since Young's death to advance the study of demotic, publishing a grammar of it in 1855. Charles Wycliffe Goodwin's essay "Hieratic Papyri", published in 1858, was the first major contribution to that subject. It emphasised that hieratic texts, not monumental hieroglyphic inscriptions, were the richest source for understanding the Egyptian language. Goodwin and his contemporary François Chabas greatly advanced the study of hieratic.

In 1866 Lepsius discovered the Canopus Decree, a parallel text like the Rosetta Stone whose inscriptions were all largely intact. The hieroglyphs could now be compared directly with their Greek translation, and the results proved the validity of the established approach to Egyptian beyond reasonable doubt. Samuel Birch, the foremost figure in British Egyptology during the mid-nineteenth century, published the first extensive dictionary of Egyptian in 1867, and in the same year Brugsch published the first volume of his dictionary of both hieroglyphic and demotic. Brugsch's dictionary established the modern understanding of the sounds of the Egyptian language, which draws upon the phonology of Semitic languages as Hincks suggested. Egyptologists have continued to refine their understanding of the language up to the present, but by this time it was on firm ground. Together with the decipherment of cuneiform in the same century, the decipherment of ancient Egyptian had opened the way for the study of the earliest stages of ancient history.
