= Ptolemaic synodal decrees =

Ancient Egyptian religious decrees

The Ptolemaic Decrees were a series of decrees by synods of ancient Egyptian priests. They were issued in the Ptolemaic Kingdom, which controlled Egypt from 305 BC to 30 BC. In each decree, the benefactions of the reigning pharaoh, especially towards the priesthood, are recognised, and religious honours are decreed for him.

Two decrees were issued under Ptolemy III Euergetes (the Decree of Alexandria and Decree of Canopus), another under Ptolemy IV Philopator (the Raphia Decree), and others under Ptolemy V Epiphanes (the Decree of Memphis and the two Philensis Decrees). Multiple copies of the decrees, inscribed on stone steles, were erected in temple courtyards, as specified in the text of the decrees.

There exist three copies plus a fragment of the Decree of Canopus, two copies of the Memphis Decree (one imperfect), and two and a half copies of the text of the Rosetta Stone, including the copy on the Nubayrah Stele and a temple wall inscription with edits, or scene replacements, completed by subsequent scribes.

== 243 BC Decree of Alexandria (Ptolemy III) ==
The Decree of Alexandria was issued on the 13th of Gorpiaios (3 December) 243 BCE. It proclaimed that statues of Ptolemy III and his wife Berenice II as well as a shrine for them should be set up in each temple to worship them as beneficent gods. The reasons cited for these honours include the king's services to Egypt in general, but above all his support for the temples; it is therefore possible that the decree was intended to strike a balance between the Greek monarch and the still powerful priesthoods.

== 238 BC Decree of Canopus (Ptolemy III) ==
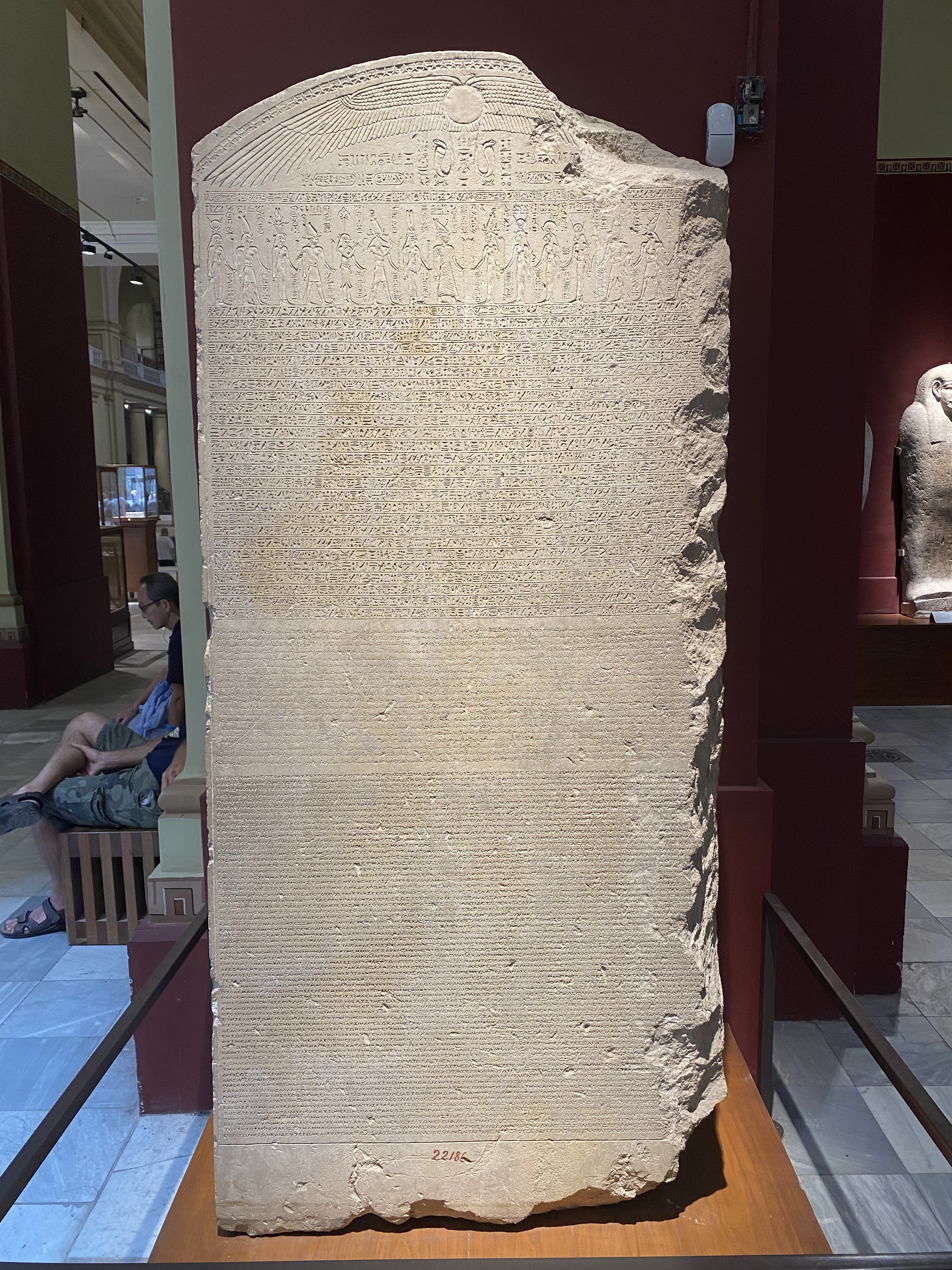
Decree of Canopus

The Decree was issued on 7 Appellaios (Mac.) = 17 Tybi (Eg.) year 9 of Ptolemy III = Thursday 7 March 238 BCE (proleptic Julian calendar).

- Stone 1: Stele of Canopus, (no. 1), found 1866, 37 lines of hieroglyphs, 74 lines of Demotic (right side), 76 lines of Greek 'capitals', fine limestone.
- Stone 2: Stele of Canopus (no. 2), found 1881, 26 lines hieroglyphs, 20 lines Demotic, 64 lines Greek 'capitals', white limestone.
- 3rd partial text with lines of hieroglyphs (now in the Louvre).
- 4th text was discovered in 2004 at Bubastis, by the German-Egyptian 'Tell Basta Project'.

== 217 BC Raphia Decree (Ptolemy IV) ==
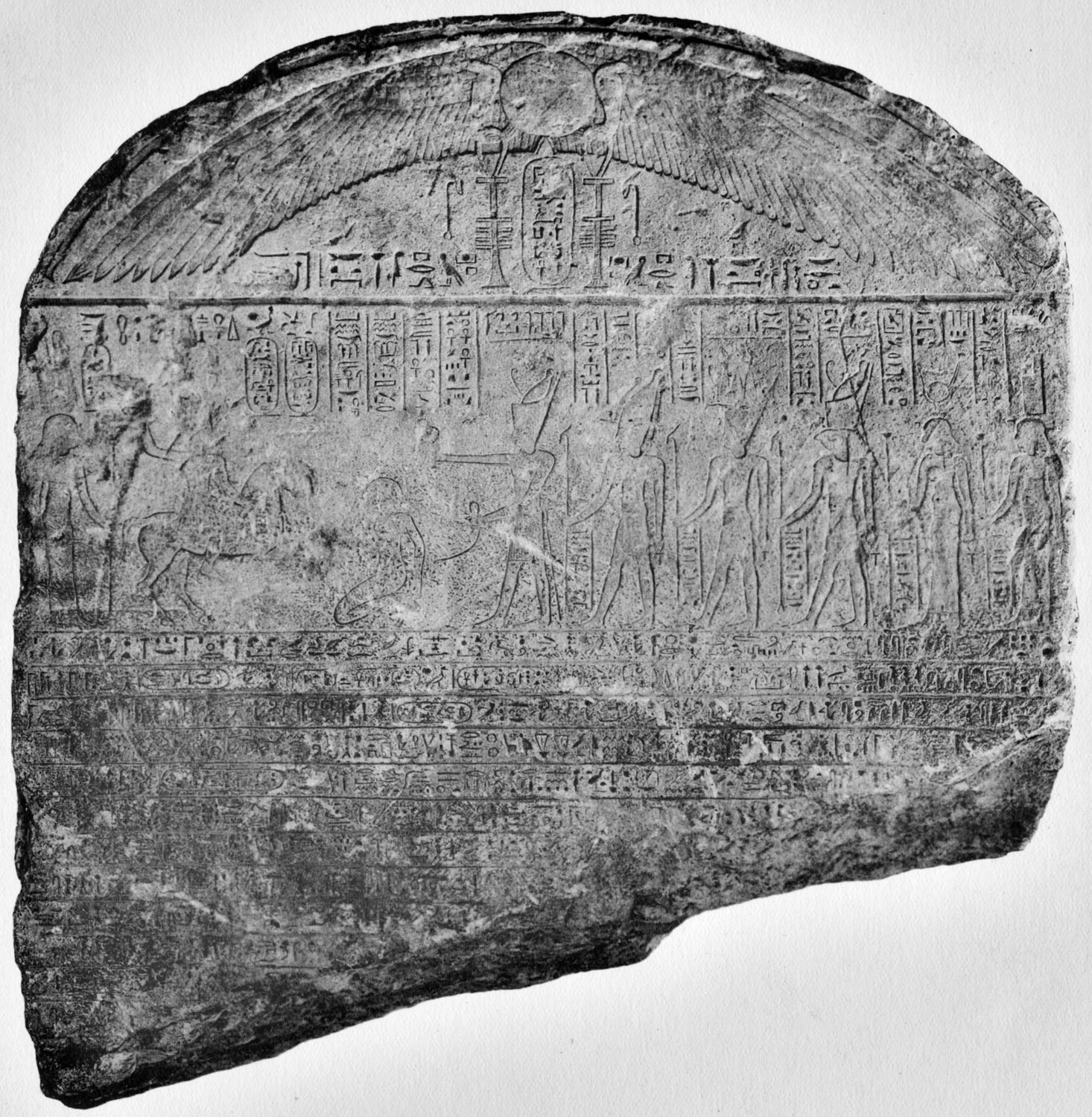
The Raphia decree, found at Memphis.

- Stone 1: Stele of Memphis (CGC 31088), found in 1902 at the site of ancient Memphis, hieroglyphs, Demotic, and Greek, dark granite.
- Stone 2: Pithom Stele, No. II (CGC 50048), found in 1923 at Tell el-Maskhuta, hieroglyphs (front), 42 lines Demotic (back), virtually complete, providing an almost total translation, and Greek (side), sandstone.
- Stone 3: Fragment from Tod found between 1934-36) disappearing shortly after discover, published based only on photographic evidence

== 196 BC Decree of Memphis (Ptolemy V) ==
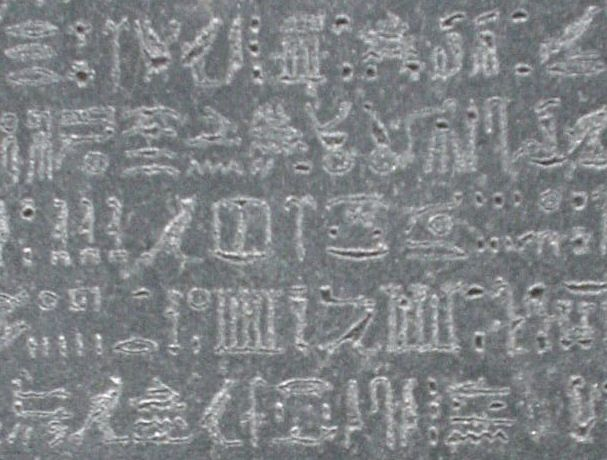
Rosetta Stone detail

- Stone 1: The Rosetta Stone, found 1799, (remaining) hieroglyphs, 14 lines, 32 lines Demotic, 54 lines Greek 'capitals', dark granite (granodiorite).
- Stone 2: Nubayrah Stele, found in the early 1880s, hieroglyphs, lines 1–27 were used to complete the missing lines on the Rosetta Stone, Demotic, Greek capitals, limestone.
- Site 3: the Temple of Philae, inscribed hieroglyphs from the Third Decree on walls, also overwritten, with scenes and figures of humans/gods.

== 186 BC Philensis II Decree (Ptolemy V) ==
Issued at Alexandria on 6 September 186 BC after the suppression of Ankhwennefer's Upper Egyptian revolt.

- Stone 1: Stele of Philae II
- Stone 2: Stele of Cairo

== 186 BC New Year's Decree (Ptolemy V) ==
Issued on 9 October 186 BC (New Year's day), perhaps to celebrate the birth of Ptolemy VI.

- Papyrus 1: P. Kroll. = P. Köln 7.313

== 185 BC Philensis I Decree (Ptolemy V) ==
Issued at Memphis on 29 October 185 BC, upon the enthronement of an Apis bull.

- Stone 1: Stele of Philae I

== 182 BC Memphis decree (Ptolemy V) ==
Issued on 29 May 182 BC, after a visit to Memphis by the Mnevis bull.

== 161 BC Decree (Ptolemy VI) ==
Issued on 31 July 161 BC, upon a royal visit to Memphis, shortly after Ptolemy VI was restored to power.

- Stone 1: Cairo Stele 22184.

== Works cited ==
- Kainz, Lukas (2022). Die umstrittenen Könige: Untersuchungen zur Stabilität des ptolemäischen Königtums. Von der Thronbesteigung Ptolemaios’ II. bis zum Tod Ptolemaios’ VI. (283/82–145 v. Chr.) [The disputed kings: Studies on the stability of the Ptolemaic monarchy. From the accession of Ptolemy II to the death of Ptolemy VI (283/82–145 BC)]. Hamburg: Dr. Kovač. ISBN 978-3-339-13044-0.
- Manning, Joseph Gilbert (2012). The Last Pharaohs: Egypt Under the Ptolemies, 305-30 BC. Princeton University Press. ISBN 9780691156385.
- Minas-Nerpel, Martina; Pfeiffer, Stefan (2010). "ESTABLISHING ROMAN RULE IN EGYPT:THE TRILINGUAL STELA OF C. CORNELIUS GALLUS FROM PHILAE". Tradition and Transformation: Egypt under Roman Rule; proceedings of the International Conference, Hildesheim, Roemer- and Plizaeus-Museum, 3–6 July 2008, Leiden (PDF). pp. 265–298.
- Pfeiffer, Stefan (2015). Griechische und lateinische Inschriften zum Ptolemäerreich und zur römischen Provinz Aegyptus. Lit. ISBN 978-3-643-13096-9.
- Stanwick, Paul Edmund (2010). Portraits of the Ptolemies: Greek Kings as Egyptian Pharaohs. University of Texas Press. ISBN 9780292787476.
- Thompson, Dorothy J. (2012). Memphis under the Ptolemies (2nd ed.). Princeton (N. J.): Princeton university press. ISBN 9780691152172.
