= Nubayrah Stele =

Copy of the Decree of Memphis (Ptolemy V) on a limestone stele

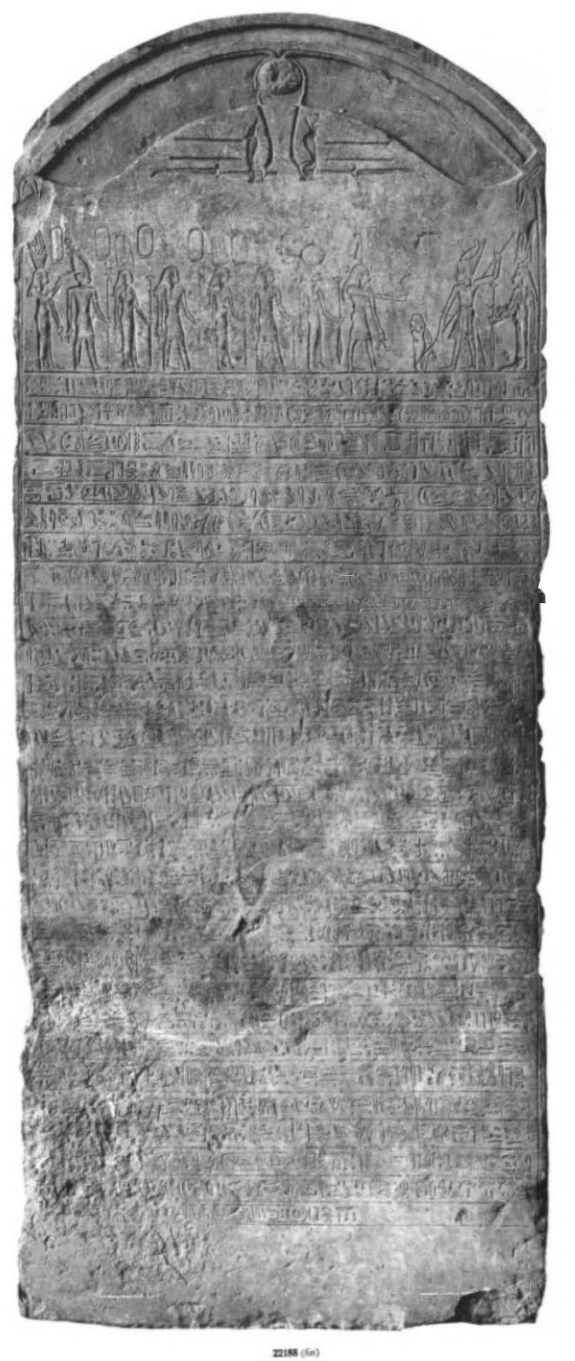
- Combined image of two photographic plates depicting the Nubayrah stele from Ahmed Kamal's catalogue
- Material: Limestone
- Size: 1.27 m x 0.51 m
- Writing: Ancient Egyptian hieroglyphs

The Nubayrah Stele is a mutilated copy of the Decree of Memphis (Ptolemy V) on a limestone stele. The same decree is found upon the Rosetta Stone. From 1848, it was known that a partial copy of the Decree was on a wall at the Temple of Philae, but overwritten in many places, by scenes, or damaged.

The limestone stele is rounded at the top; it measures 4 feet 2 inches (1.27 m) high, and 1 foot 8 inches (0.51 m) wide.' The Nubayrah Stele is named for the present-day town of Noubarya-(?) on the former Canopic branch of the Nile River; the town is southwest of Damanhur. The original "Nubayrah" was close to Damanhur.

The Nubayrah Stele is located in the Egyptian Museum, no. 5576.

== Publication history ==
The hieroglyph text was published in the 1800s and early 1900s in five resources:

1. Urbain Bouriant, "La stèle 5576 du Musée du Boulaq-(now Egyptian Museum) et L'inscription de Rosette", in Recueil de travaux, Paris, 1885, vol vi, pp 1-20.
2. Baillet, Le décret de Memphis et les inscriptiones de Rosette et de Damanhour, Paris, 1905.
3. Ahmed Kamal (Egyptologist), Catalogue générale des antiquités égyptiennes, No. 22188, with photographic reproduction.
4. Kurt Heinrich Sethe, Urkunden, iv, p. 169. (best and complete transcripts)
5. Spiegelberg, Kanopus und Memphis (Rosettan), Heidelberg, 1922. (best and complete transcripts)

== See also ==
- Coptos Decree
- Great Mendes Stela
- Ptolemaic Decrees
