= Decree of Canopus =

Trilingual decree from ancient Egypt

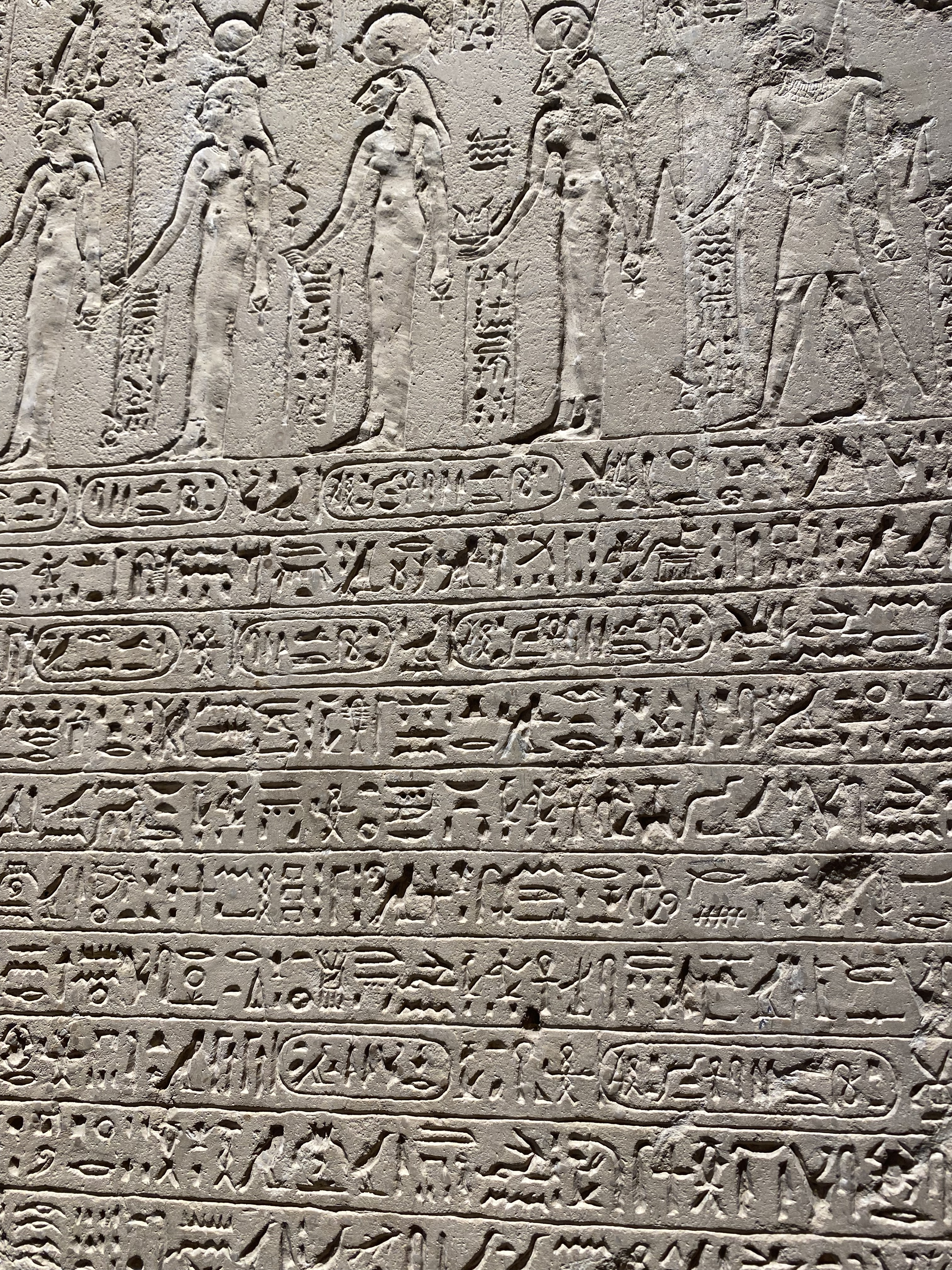
- Material: Granodiorite
- Size: 7 feet 4 inches in height
- Writing: Egyptian hieroglyphs, demotic, and Koine Greek script
- Created: 238 BC
- Discovered: 1866; Tanis, Egypt
- Discovered by: Karl Richard Lepsius
- Present location: Egyptian Museum, Cairo, Egypt

The Decree of Canopus is a trilingual inscription in three scripts, which dates from the Ptolemaic period of ancient Egypt. It was written in three writing systems: Egyptian hieroglyphs, demotic, and koine Greek, on several ancient Egyptian memorial stones, or steles. The inscription is a record of a great assembly of priests held at Canopus, Egypt, on 7 Appellaios (Mac.) = 17 Tybi (Eg.) year 9 of Ptolemy III = Thursday 7 March 238 BC (proleptic Julian calendar). Their decree honoured Pharaoh Ptolemy III Euergetes; Queen Berenice, his wife; and Princess Berenice.

== Ancient Copies of the Decree ==
In 1866, Karl Richard Lepsius discovered at Tanis the first copy of this Decree (this copy was originally known as the 'Şân Stele'). Another copy was found in 1881 by Gaston Maspero at Kom el-Hisn in the western Nile Delta. Later on, some other fragmentary copies were found.

In March 2004, while excavating at Bubastis, the German–Egyptian 'Tell Basta Project' archaeologists discovered yet another well preserved copy of the Decree.

An additional complete copy was unearthed in September 2025, near the Egyptian city of El-Husseiniya. The sandstone stele represents the first complete version of the decree found in more than 150 years and is inscribed entirely in hieroglyphs, unlike earlier trilingual copies (hieroglyphic, Demotic, and Greek).

== Importance for the decipherment of hieroglyphs ==
This is the second earliest of the series of trilingual inscriptions of the "Rosetta Stone Series", also known as Ptolemaic Decrees. Having a greater number of different hieroglyphs than the Rosetta Stone, the Canopus Stone has proved crucial in deciphering them. There are four such decrees:

1. The Decree of Alexandria from 243 BC;
2. The Decree of Canopus of Ptolemy III in 238 BC;
3. The Decree of Memphis, for Ptolemy IV in 218 BC;
4. The Memphis Decree (whose best-known copy is the Rosetta Stone), inscribed for Ptolemy V in 196 BC.

== Contents of the inscription ==
The inscription touches on subjects such as military campaigns, famine relief, Egyptian religion and governmental organization in Ptolemaic Egypt. It mentions the king's donations to the temples, his support for the Apis and Mnevis cults, which enjoyed huge success in the Macedonian – Egyptian world, and the return of divine statues which had been carried off by Cambyses. It extols the king's success in quelling insurgencies of native Egyptians, operations referred to as 'keeping the peace.' It reminds the reader that during a year of low inundation, the government had remitted taxes and imported grain from abroad. It inaugurates a solar calendar with 365¼ days per year (the most accurate in the ancient world). It declares the deceased princess Berenike a goddess and creates a cult for her, with women, men, ceremonies, and special 'bread-cakes'. Lastly it orders the decree to be incised in stone or bronze in both hieroglyphs and Greek, and to be publicly displayed in the temples.

The Decree of Canopus attested the existence of the ancient city of Heracleion, which is now submerged, and has only recently been excavated. The Decree informs, in its Greek version, that a synod of priests was held in the city of Heracleion during the reign of King Ptolemy I.

== Calendar reform ==
The civil Egyptian calendar had 365 days: twelve months of thirty days each and an additional five epagomenal days. According to the reform, the five-day "Opening of the Year" ceremonies would include an additional sixth day every fourth year. The reason given was that "the rise of Sothis advances to another day in every 4 years", so that attaching the beginning of the year to the heliacal rising of the star Sirius would keep the calendar synchronized with the seasons.

This Ptolemaic calendar reform failed, but was finally officially implemented in Egypt by Augustus in 26 or 25 BC, now called the Alexandrian calendar, with a sixth epagomenal day occurring for the first time on 29 August 22 BC. This reformed version of the calendar was the official of Egypt until it was replaced by the Gregorian Calendar by Khedive Ismail Pasha of Egypt; yet it remains used by the farming populace.

Julius Caesar had earlier implemented a 365 1/4 day year in Rome in 45 BC as part of the Julian calendar.

== Gallery ==
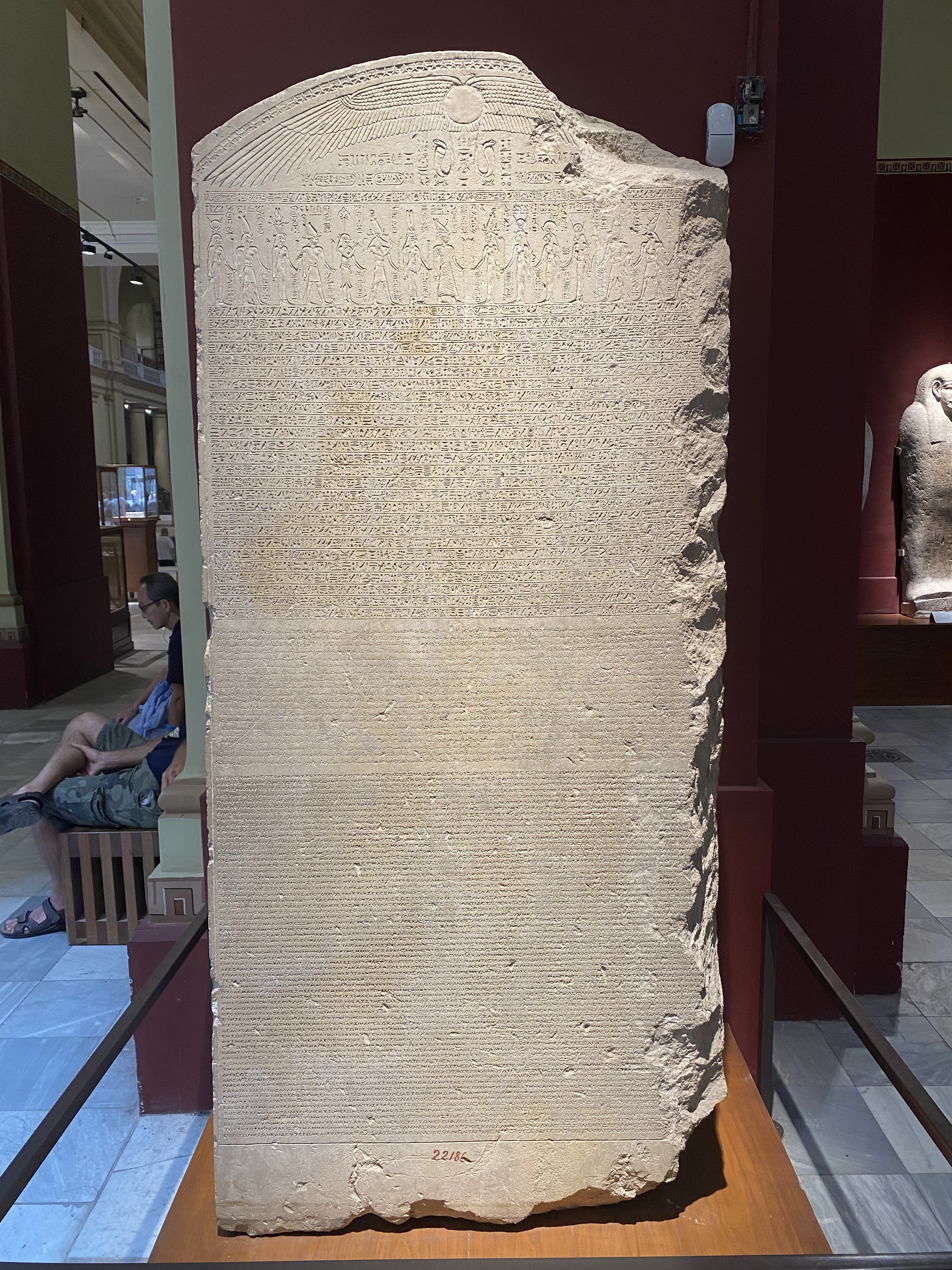
the Decree of Canopus, on display at the Egyptian Museum in Cairo, Egypt

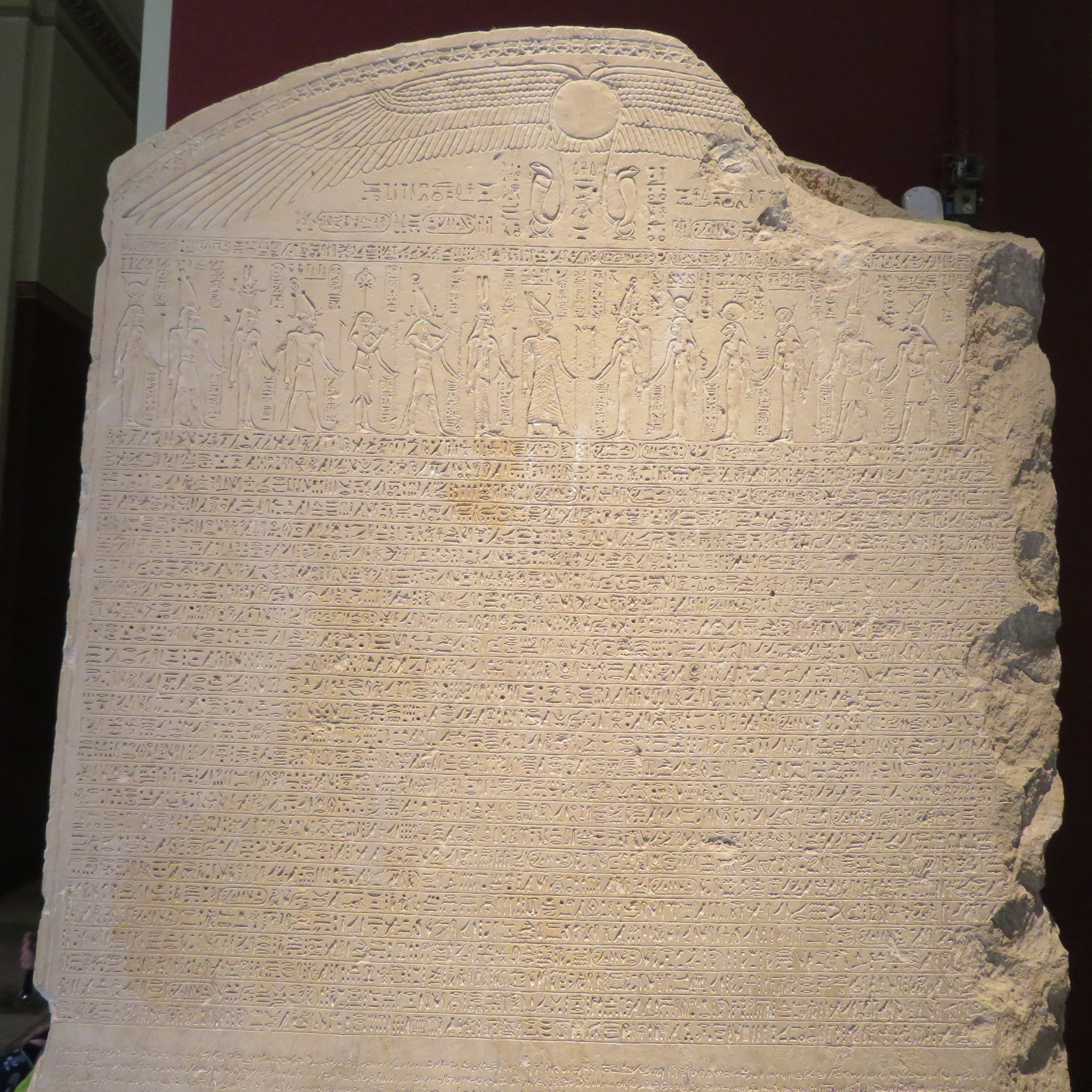
top portion of the Decree of Canopus, on display at the Egyptian Museum in Cairo, Egypt

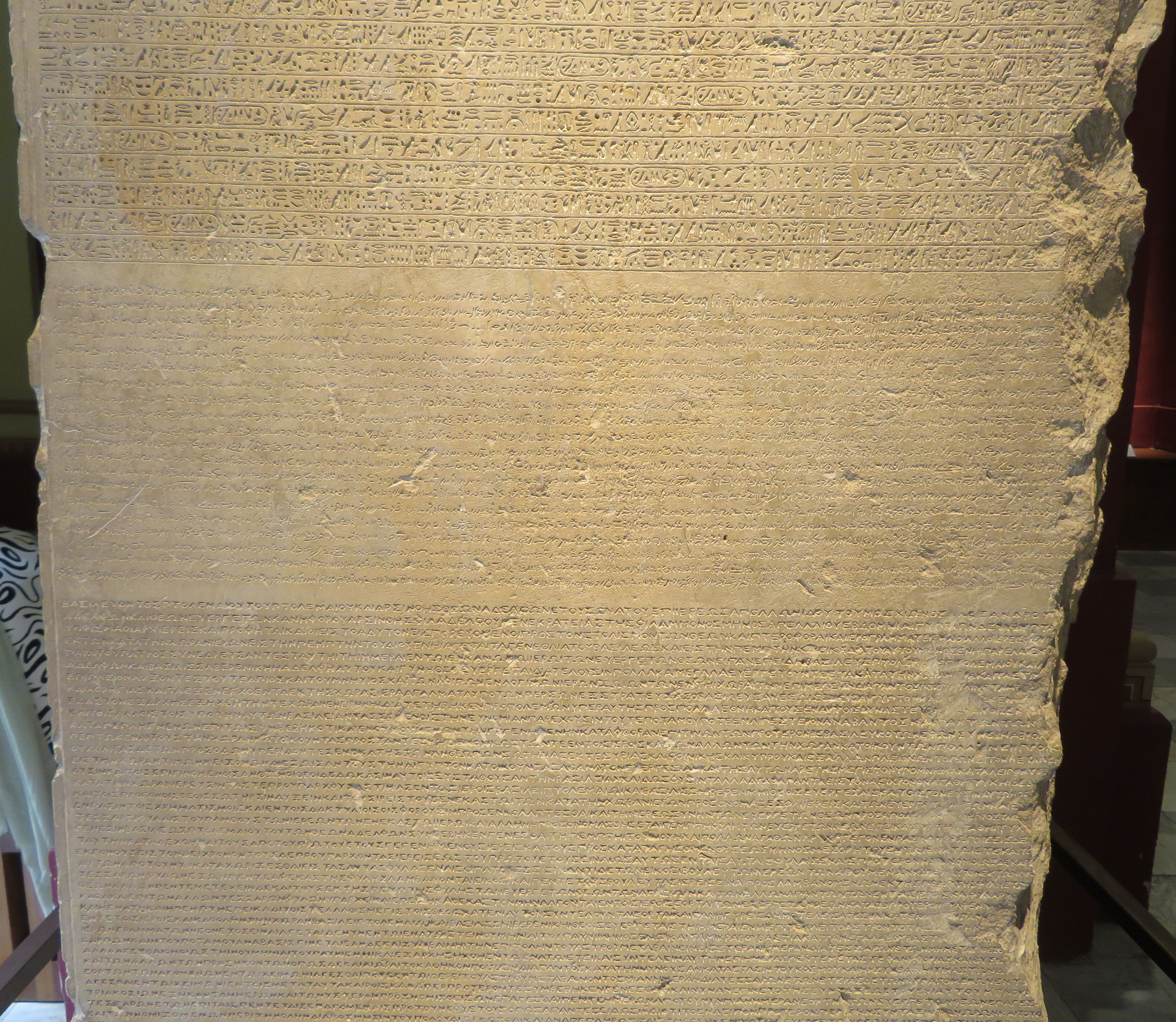
middle portion of the Decree of Canopus, on display at the Egyptian Museum in Cairo, Egypt

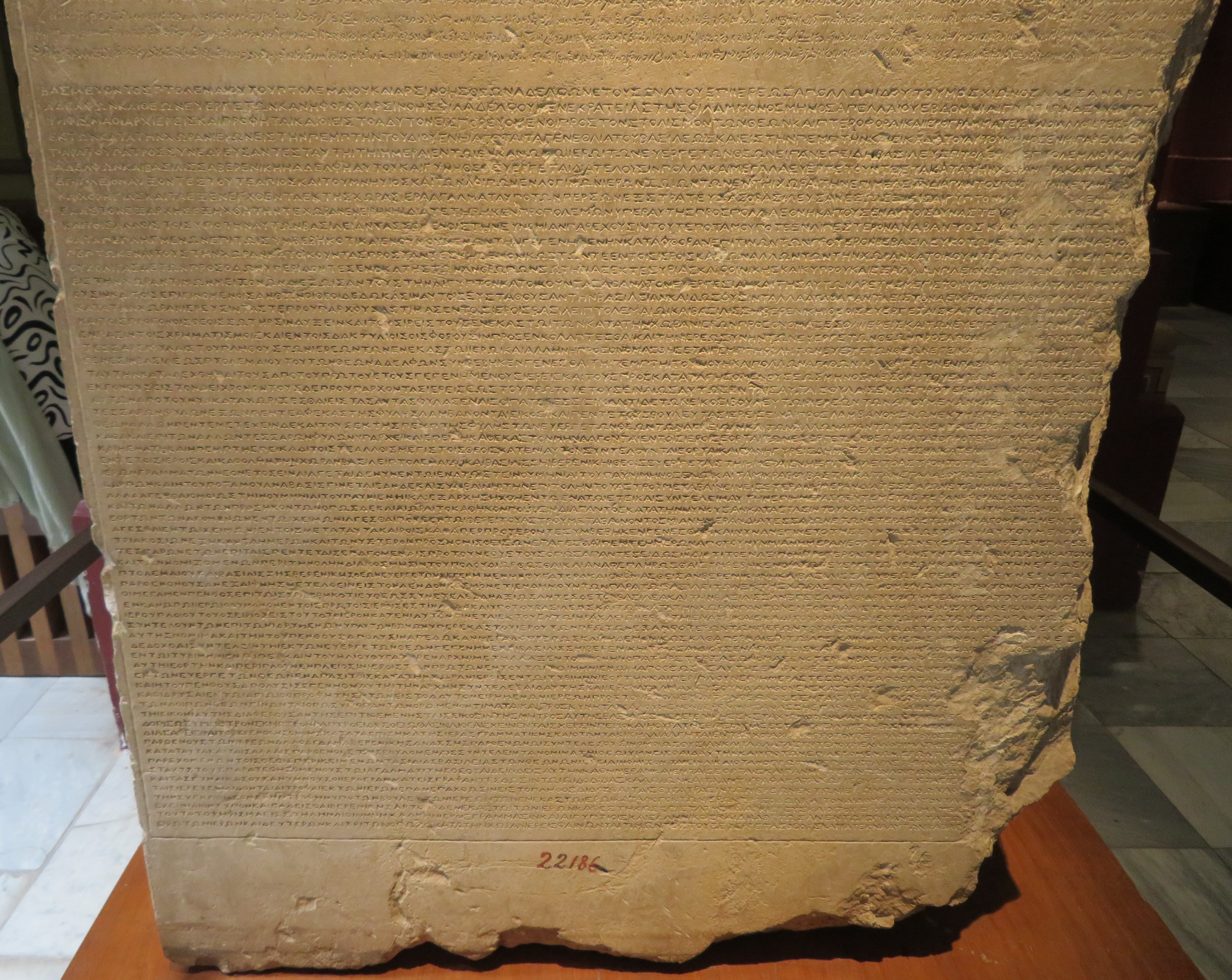
bottom portion of the Decree of Canopus, on display at the Egyptian Museum in Cairo, Egypt

== See also ==
- Ptolemaic Decrees
- Decree of Memphis, or Raphia Decree, for Ptolemy IV
- Great Mendes Stela, for Ptolemy II
- Rosetta Stone decree, for Ptolemy V

== Sources ==
- Budge. The Rosetta Stone, E. A. Wallis Budge, (Dover Publications), (c) 1929, Dover edition (unabridged), 1989. (softcover, ISBN 0-486-26163-8)
- Pfeiffer, Stefan. Das Dekret von Kanopos (238 v. Chr.). Kommentar und historische Auswertung eines dreisprachigen Synodaldekretes der ägyptischen Priester zu Ehren Ptolemaios' III. und seiner Familie. Munich/Leipzig: K. G. Saur, 2004.
- Pfeiffer, Stefan (2015). Griechische und lateinische Inschriften zum Ptolemäerreich und zur römischen Provinz Aegyptus. Lit. pp. 75–88. ISBN 978-3-643-13096-9.
