= Classical antiquity =

Age of the ancient Greeks and Romans

- c. 800 BC – c. 300 AD
Iron Age	Late Antiquity
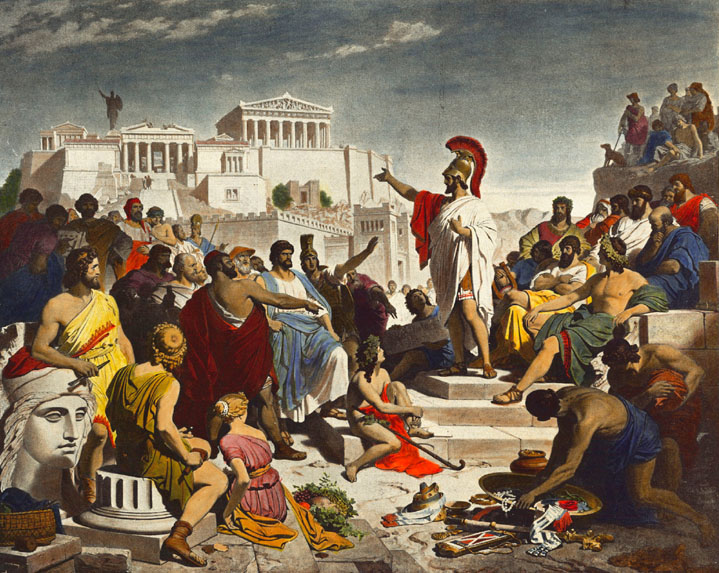
- Pericles Gives the Funeral Speech (Perikles hält die Leichenrede), by painter Philipp von Foltz (1852)
- Location: Mediterranean
- Key events: Greek colonization Peloponnesian War; Wars of the Diadochi; Roman Republic; Punic Wars; Roman Empire

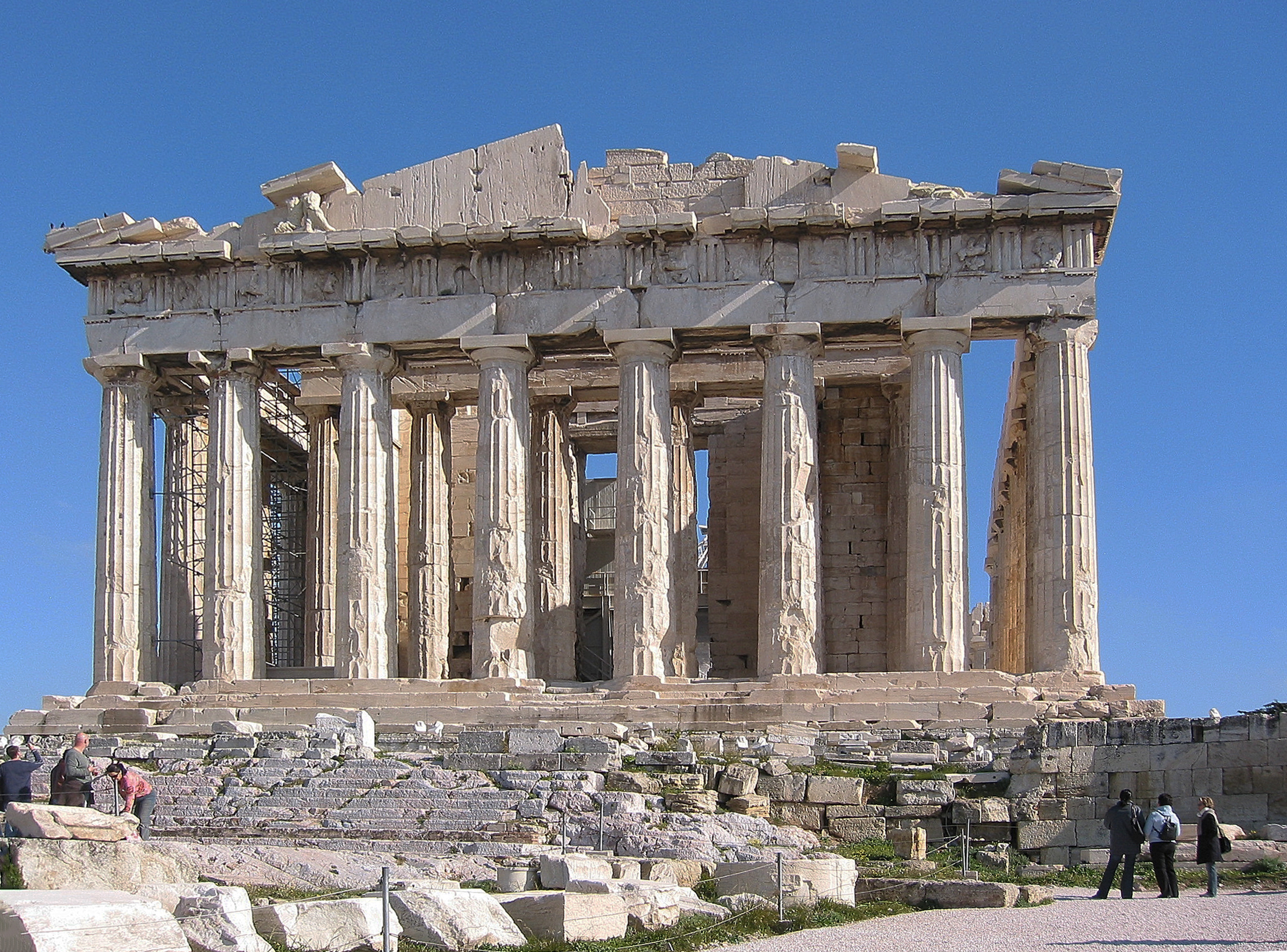
The Parthenon is one of the most recognizable symbols of the classical era, exemplifying ancient Greek culture.

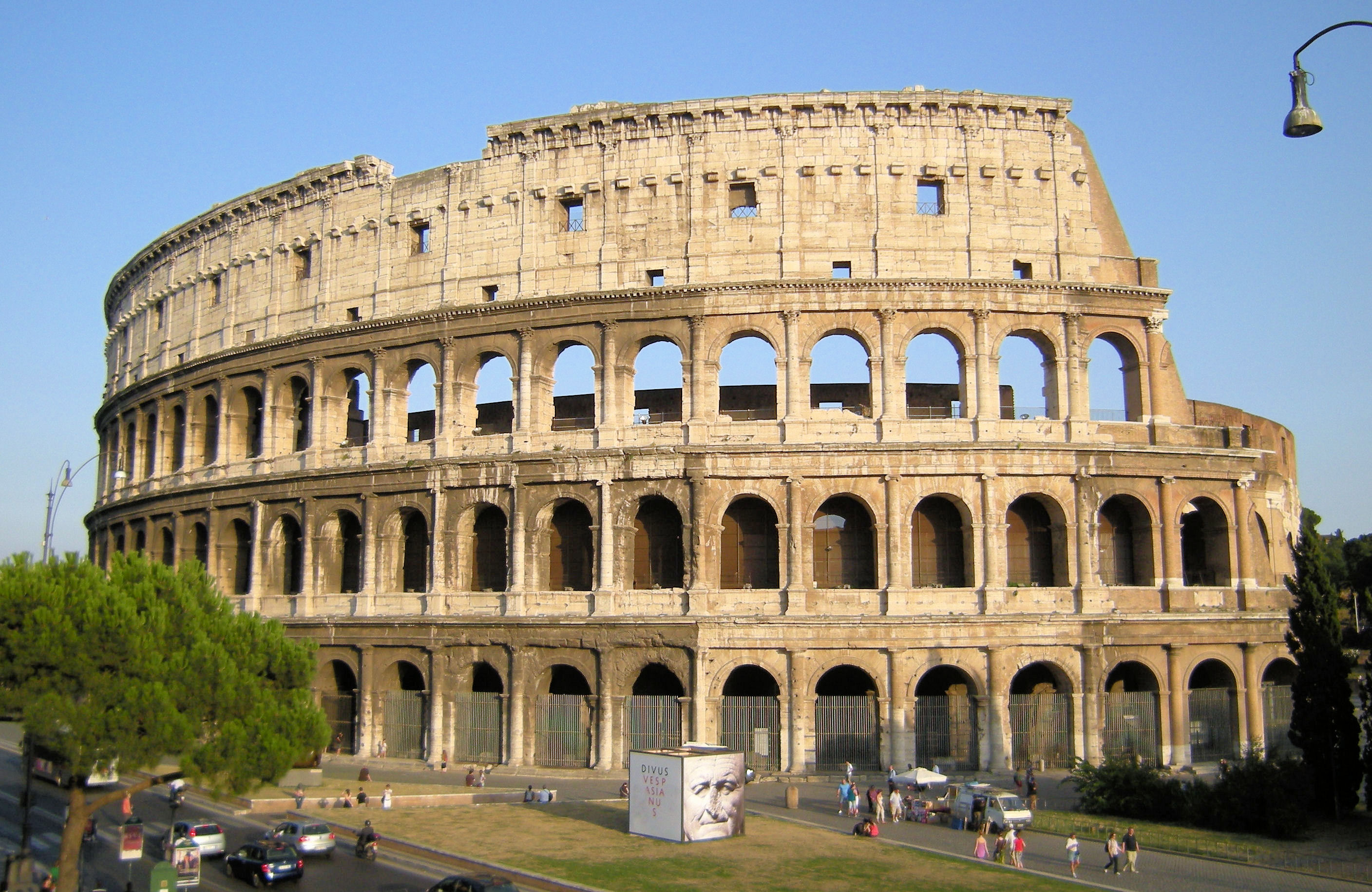
The Colosseum, a prominent symbol of the Roman classical era and culture

Classical antiquity, also known as the classical era, classical period, classical age, or simply antiquity, is the period of cultural European history between the 8th century BC and the 5th century AD, (Note: The precise end date of this period is disputed, with estimates ranging from the 3rd–8th centuries AD. Traditionally, it is given as the late 5th century AD.) following the Greek Dark Ages and being succeeded by late antiquity. It comprises the interwoven civilizations of ancient Greece and Rome, known together as the Greco-Roman world, which played a major role in shaping the culture of the Mediterranean basin. It is the period during which ancient Greece and Rome flourished and had major influence throughout much of Europe, North Africa, and West Asia.

Conventionally, it is often considered to begin with the earliest recorded Epic Greek poetry of Homer (8th–7th centuries BC) and end with the fall of the Western Roman Empire in 476 AD. Such a wide span of history and territory covers many disparate cultures and periods. Classical antiquity may also refer to an idealized vision among later people of what was, in Edgar Allan Poe's words, "the glory that was Greece, and the grandeur that was Rome".

The culture of the ancient Greeks, together with some influences from the ancient Near East, was the basis of art, philosophy, society, and education in the Mediterranean and Near East until the Roman imperial period. The Romans preserved, imitated, and spread this culture throughout Europe, until they were able to compete with it. This Greco-Roman cultural foundation has been immensely influential on the language, politics, law, educational systems, philosophy, science, warfare, literature, historiography, ethics, rhetoric, art and architecture of both the Western, and through it, the modern world.

Surviving fragments of classical culture helped produce a revival beginning during the 14th century, which later came to be known as the Renaissance, and various neo-classical revivals occurred during the 18th and 19th centuries.

== History ==
Compact timeline of classical antiquity.

=== Archaic period (c. 8th to c. 6th centuries BC) ===
The earliest period of classical antiquity occurs during a time of gradual resurgence of historical sources after the Late Bronze Age collapse. The 8th and 7th centuries BC are still largely protohistorical, with the earliest Greek alphabetic inscriptions appearing during the first half of the 8th century. The legendary poet Homer is usually assumed to have lived during the 8th or 7th century BC, and his lifetime is often considered as the beginning of classical antiquity. During the same period is the traditional date for the establishment of the Ancient Olympic Games, in 776 BC.

==== Phoenicians, Carthaginians and Assyrians ====
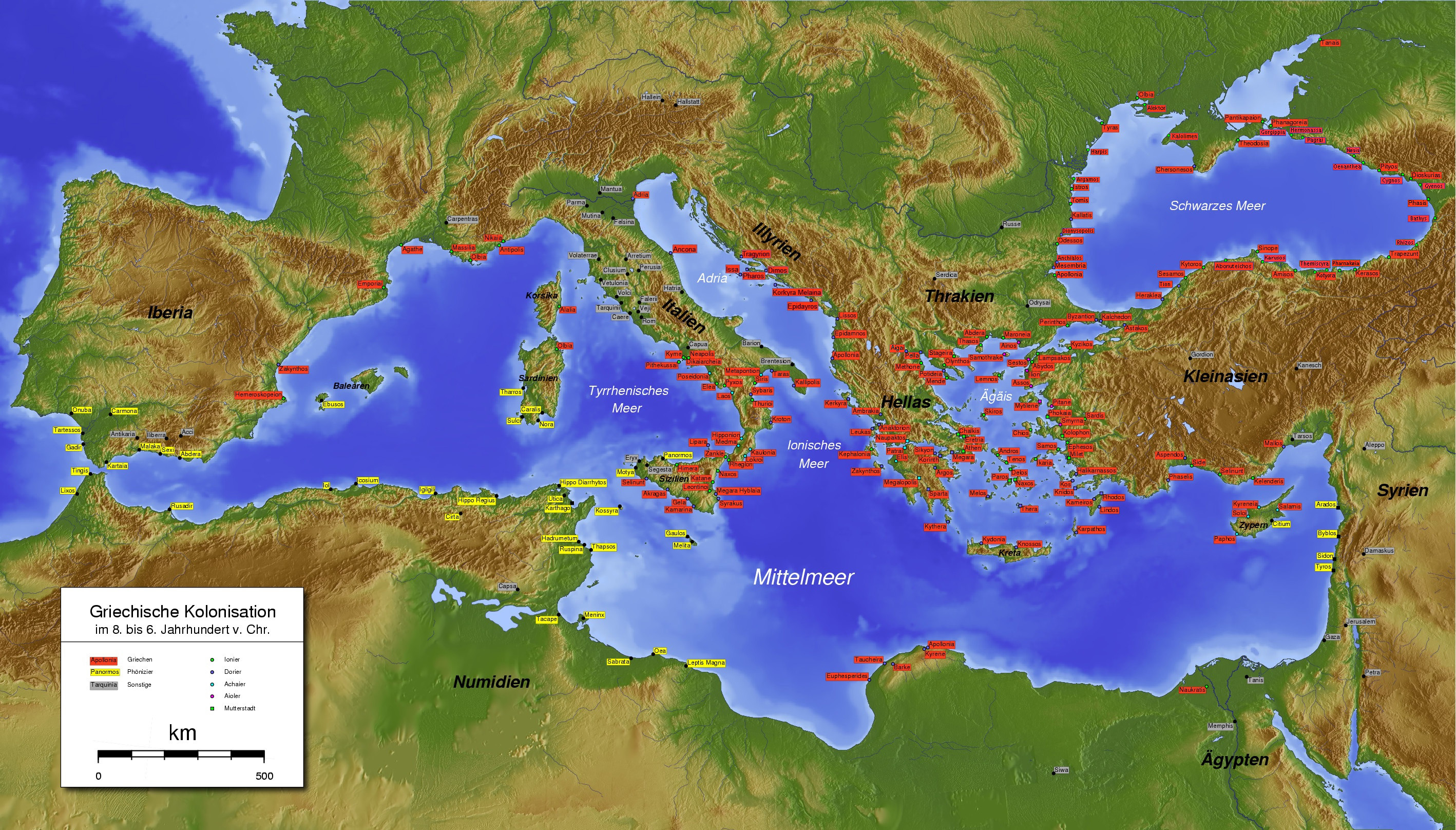
Map of Phoenician (in yellow) and Greek colonies (in red) about 8th to 6th century BC.

The Phoenicians originally expanded from ports in Canaan, by the 8th century dominating trade in the Mediterranean. Carthage was founded in 814 BC, and the Carthaginians by 700 BC had established strongholds in Sicily, Italy and Sardinia, which created conflicts of interest with Etruria. A stele found in Kition, Cyprus, commemorates the victory of King Sargon II in 709 BC over the seven kings of the island, marking an important part of the transfer of Cyprus from Tyrian rule to the Neo-Assyrian Empire.

==== Greece ====
The Archaic period followed the Greek Dark Ages, and saw significant advancements in political theory, and the beginnings of democracy, philosophy, theatre, poetry, as well as the revitalization of the written language (which had been lost during the Dark Ages).

In pottery, the Archaic period sees the development of the Orientalizing style, which signals a shift from the geometric style of the later Dark Ages and the accumulation of influences derived from Egypt, Phoenicia and Syria. Pottery styles associated with the later part of the Archaic age are the black-figure pottery, which originated in Corinth during the 7th century BC and its successor, the red-figure style, developed by the Andokides Painter in about 530 BC.

==== Greek colonies ====
Greek territories and colonies (Archaic period: 750–550 BC)

The Greek colonisation was the expansion of Archaic Greeks across the Mediterranean and the Black Sea, particularly during the 8th–6th centuries BCE.

The Archaic expansion differed from the Iron Age migrations of the Greek Dark Ages, in that it consisted of organised direction by oikistes away from the originating metropolis rather than the simplistic movement of tribes, which characterised the aforementioned earlier migrations. Many colonies, or apoikiai (Greek: ἀποικία, transl. "home away from home"), that were founded during this period eventually evolved into strong Greek city-states, functioning independently of their metropolis.

==== Iron Age Italy ====
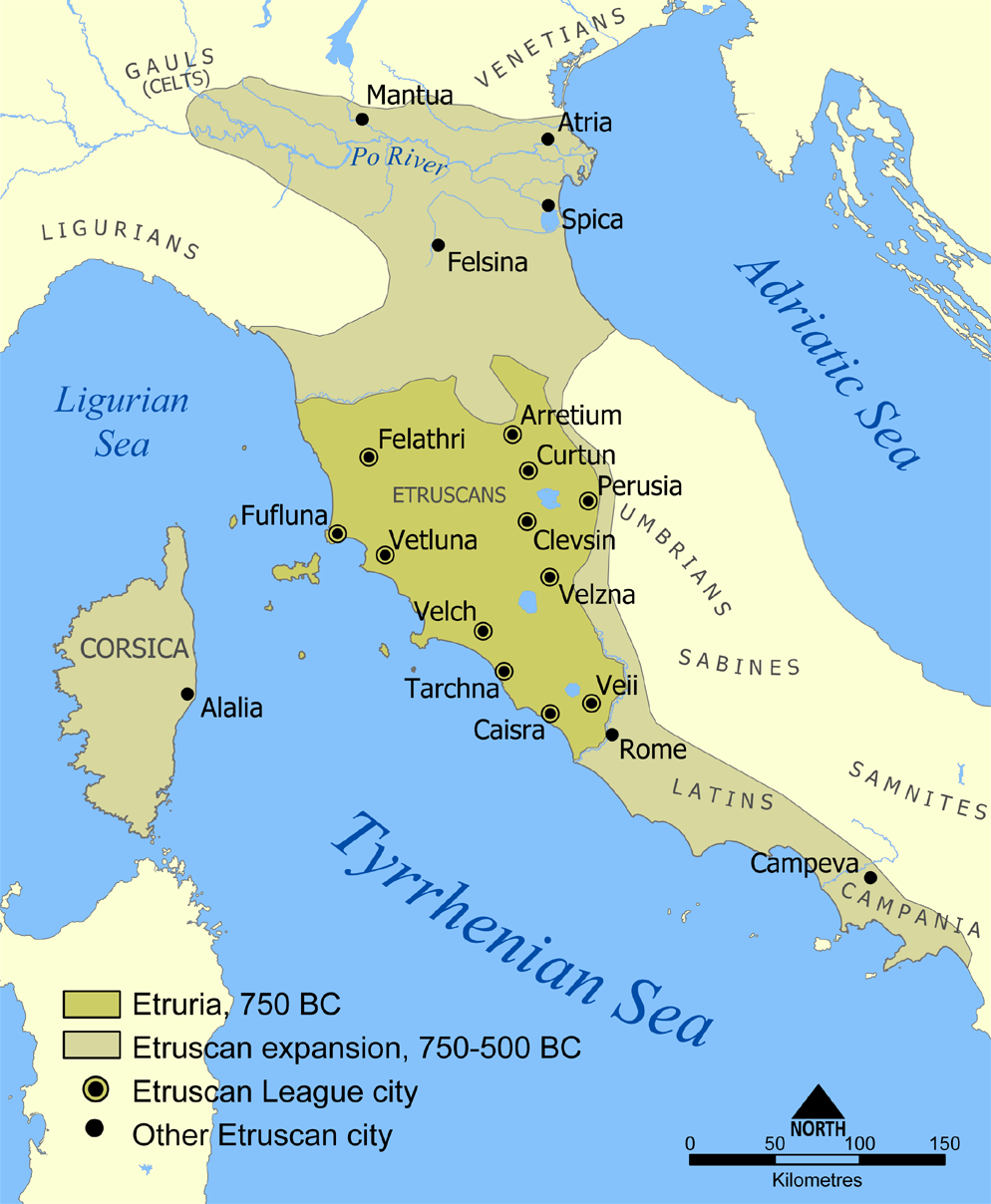
Etruscan civilization in north of Italy, 800 BC.

The Etruscans had established political control in the region by the late 7th-century BC, forming the aristocratic and monarchial elite. The Etruscans apparently lost power in the area by the late 6th-century BC, and at this time, the Italic tribes reinvented their government by creating republics, with greater restraints on the ability of individual rulers to exercise power.

==== Roman kingdom ====
According to legend, Rome was founded on 21 April 753 BC by twin descendants of the Trojan prince Aeneas, Romulus and Remus. As the city was bereft of women, legend says that the Latins invited the Sabines to a festival and stole their unmarried maidens, resulting in the integration of Latins and Sabines.

Archaeological evidence indeed shows first traces of settlement at the Roman Forum in the mid-8th century BC, though settlements on the Palatine Hill may date back to the 10th century BC.

According to legend, the seventh and final king of Rome was Tarquinius Superbus. As the son of Tarquinius Priscus and the son-in-law of Servius Tullius, Superbus was of Etruscan birth. It was during his reign that the Etruscans reached their apex of power. Superbus removed and destroyed all the Sabine shrines and altars from the Tarpeian Rock, enraging the people of Rome. The people came to object to his rule when he failed to recognize the rape of Lucretia, a patrician Roman, by his own son. Lucretia's kinsman, Lucius Junius Brutus (ancestor to Marcus Brutus), summoned the Senate and had Superbus and the monarchy expelled from Rome in 510 BC. After Superbus' expulsion, the Senate in 509 BC voted to never again allow the rule of a king and reformed Rome into a republican government.

=== Classical Egypt (7th to 1st centuries BC) ===
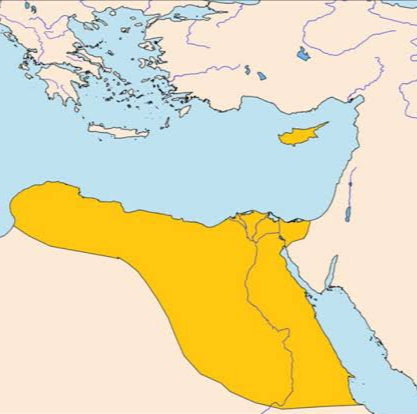
Map of Egypt (in yellow) in the late period.

In 605 BC, the Fall of Ashdod was a successful Egyptian assault on the city of Ashdod, one of the five cities of the famed Philistine pentapolis, located in southwestern Canaan. According to the Greek historian Herodotus, pharaoh Psamtik I besieged Ashdod for 29 years. Ashdod had lost most of its inhabitants during those long years of siege. In 654 BCE, Psamtik I was firmly in control of all Egypt. By 653 BC, the Egyptian king Psamtik I was able to oust the Assyrians with the help of Egypt's first navy. Greek influence expanded greatly as the city-state of Naucratis became the home of Greeks in the Nile Delta. The Saite kings based in the new capital of Sais witnessed a spirited resurgence in the economy and culture.

In 609 BC, Pharaoh Necho II led the Egyptian army to Carchemish (northern Syria) to join with his allies, the fading Neo-Assyrian Empire, against the surging Neo-Babylonian Empire. This required passing through territory controlled by the Kingdom of Judah. The Judaean king Josiah refused to let the Egyptians pass. The Judaean forces battled the Egyptians at the Battle of Megiddo at Megiddo, resulting in the capture of Jerusalem by the Egyptians and Josiah's death and his kingdom becoming a vassal state of Egypt. The battle is recorded in the Hebrew Bible, the Greek 1 Esdras, and the writings of Jewish historian Josephus.

In 570 BC, Egypt conquered Cyprus, and this marked the very first time in history that the island of Cyprus was taken entirely by an outside force. This brief period of Egyptian rule began during the reign of Amasis II, and left its influence mainly in the arts, especially sculpture, where the rigidity and the dress of the Egyptian style can be observed. Cypriot artists later discarded this Egyptian style in favour of Greek prototypes. Although Egyptian rule lasted for about 45 years until 525 BC, it left a distinct imprint on Cypriot life and culture. The Persian Empire, led by Cambyses II, began its conquest of Egypt in 525 BC, eventually defeating the pharaoh Psamtik III at the Battle of Pelusium. Cambyses II then assumed the formal title of pharaoh, but ruled Egypt from Persia, leaving Egypt under the control of a satrap. Several revolts and military conflicts against the Persians marked the whole 5th century BC.

Egypt was able to overthrow the Persians in 404 BC, regaining independence and full sovereignty under a series of native dynasties. The pharaoh Teos succeeded his father Nectanebo I around 361 BC, and quickly began planning a military campaign into Palestine and Phoenicia, regions then under Persian control. Taking advantage of a moment of weakness in the Achaemenid Empire, resulting from unrest in some states of Asia Minor. However, to finance this campaign, Teos was forced to impose new taxes and confiscate temple property, thus upsetting the delicate balance skillfully established by his father, Nectanebo I. This measure secured the necessary funding for Teos, but it also brought him considerable popular resentment, despite the Egyptian army's eventual victory.

During the reign of Nectanebo II, Egyptian artists developed a distinctive style that left a clear mark on Egypt’s history. Like his indirect predecessor Nectanebo I, he showed great enthusiasm for many of the rituals of worshiping the gods in the ancient Egyptian religion, and more than one hundred Egyptian archaeological sites testify to his interest in them for many years. The Egyptian gold stater, the first Egyptian coin to be minted in Egypt, was struck during his reign in 360 BC. Nectanebo II was eventually defeated, and in the summer of 342 BC, Artaxerxes entered Memphis and installed himself as its ruler. Nectanebo II made an unsuccessful attempt to regain the throne, to be the last pharaoh of the Thirtieth Dynasty. A brief restoration of Persian rule, sometimes known as the Thirty-First Dynasty, began in 343 BC, but shortly after, in 332 BC, the Persian ruler Mazaces handed the rule of Egypt over to Alexander the Great without a fight.

In 305 BC, the Ptolemaic Kingdom of Egypt was founded as an autonomous state with Alexandria as the Egyptian capital. It was founded by general Ptolemy I Soter, and was ruled by the Ptolemaic dynasty until the death of Cleopatra VII in 30 BC. Alexandria, became a major center of culture, learning, and trade for the next several centuries. Reigning for nearly three centuries, this dynasty was the longest and final dynasty of ancient Egypt. Although the dynasty was not Egyptian, the Egyptians maintained control over local and religious institutions and concentrated power in the central bureaucracy.

Following the Syrian Wars with the Seleucid Empire, a rival Hellenistic state, the Ptolemaic Kingdom expanded its territory to include eastern Libya, and northern Nubia. By the mid 3rd century BC, Ptolemaic Egypt was one of the wealthiest states of the Mediterranean. At its peak under Ptolemy III Euergetes, the Egyptian kingdom was the greatest power in the Mediterranean, and a major center of scientific, artistic, and intellectual development. In 206 BC, the Great Theban Revolt outbreak and Egyptians were able to rule Upper Egypt with the revolt leader Horwennefer declared pharaoh, and was succeeded by Ankhwennefer in 199 BC. The revolt was eventually suppressed in 186 BC after twenty years of military conflicts between the Egyptians and the Greeks. Beginning in the mid second century BC, dynastic strife and a series of foreign wars and local revolts weakened the kingdom, and Egypt became increasingly reliant on the Roman Republic.

=== Classical Greece (5th to 4th centuries BC) ===
Delian League ("Athenian Empire"), just before the Peloponnesian War in 431 BC.

The classical period of ancient Greece corresponds to most of the 5th and 4th centuries BC, in particular, from the end of the Athenian tyranny in 510 BC to the death of Alexander the Great in 323 BC. In 510, Spartan troops helped the Athenians overthrow the tyrant Hippias, son of Peisistratos. Cleomenes I, king of Sparta, established a pro-Spartan oligarchy conducted by Isagoras.

The Greco-Persian Wars (499–449 BC), concluded by the Peace of Callias ended with not only the liberation of Greece, Macedon, Thrace, and Ionia from Persian rule, but also with the dominance of Athens in the Delian League, which resulted in conflict with Sparta and the Peloponnesian League, resulting in the Peloponnesian War (431–404 BC), ending with a Spartan victory.

Greece began the 4th century with Spartan hegemony, but by 395 BC the Spartan rulers dismissed Lysander from office, and Sparta lost its naval supremacy. Athens, Argos, Thebes and Corinth, the latter two of which were formerly Spartan allies, challenged Spartan dominance in the Corinthian War, which ended inconclusively in 387 BC. Later, in 371 BC, the Theban generals Epaminondas and Pelopidas won a victory at the Battle of Leuctra. The result of this battle was the end of Spartan supremacy and the establishment of Theban hegemony. Thebes sought to maintain its dominance until it was finally ended by the increasing power of Macedon in 346 BC.

During the reign of Philip II (359–336 BC), Macedon expanded into the territory of the Paeonians, the Thracians and the Illyrians. Philip's son, Alexander the Great, (356–323 BC) managed to briefly extend Macedonian power not only over the central Greek city-states but also to the Persian Empire, including Egypt and lands as far east as the fringes of India. The classical Greek period conventionally ends at the death of Alexander in 323 BC and the fragmentation of his empire, which was at this time divided among the Diadochi.

=== Hellenistic period (323–146 BC) ===
Greece began the Hellenistic period with the increasing power of Macedon and the conquests of Alexander the Great. Greek became the lingua franca far beyond Greece itself, and Hellenistic culture interacted with the cultures of Persia, the Kingdom of Israel and Kingdom of Judah, Central Asia and Egypt. Significant advances were made in the sciences (geography, astronomy, mathematics, etc.), notably with the followers of Aristotle (Aristotelianism).

The Hellenistic period ended with the increase of the Roman Republic to a super-regional power during the 2nd century BC and the Roman conquest of Greece in 146 BC.

=== Roman Republic (5th to 1st centuries BC) ===
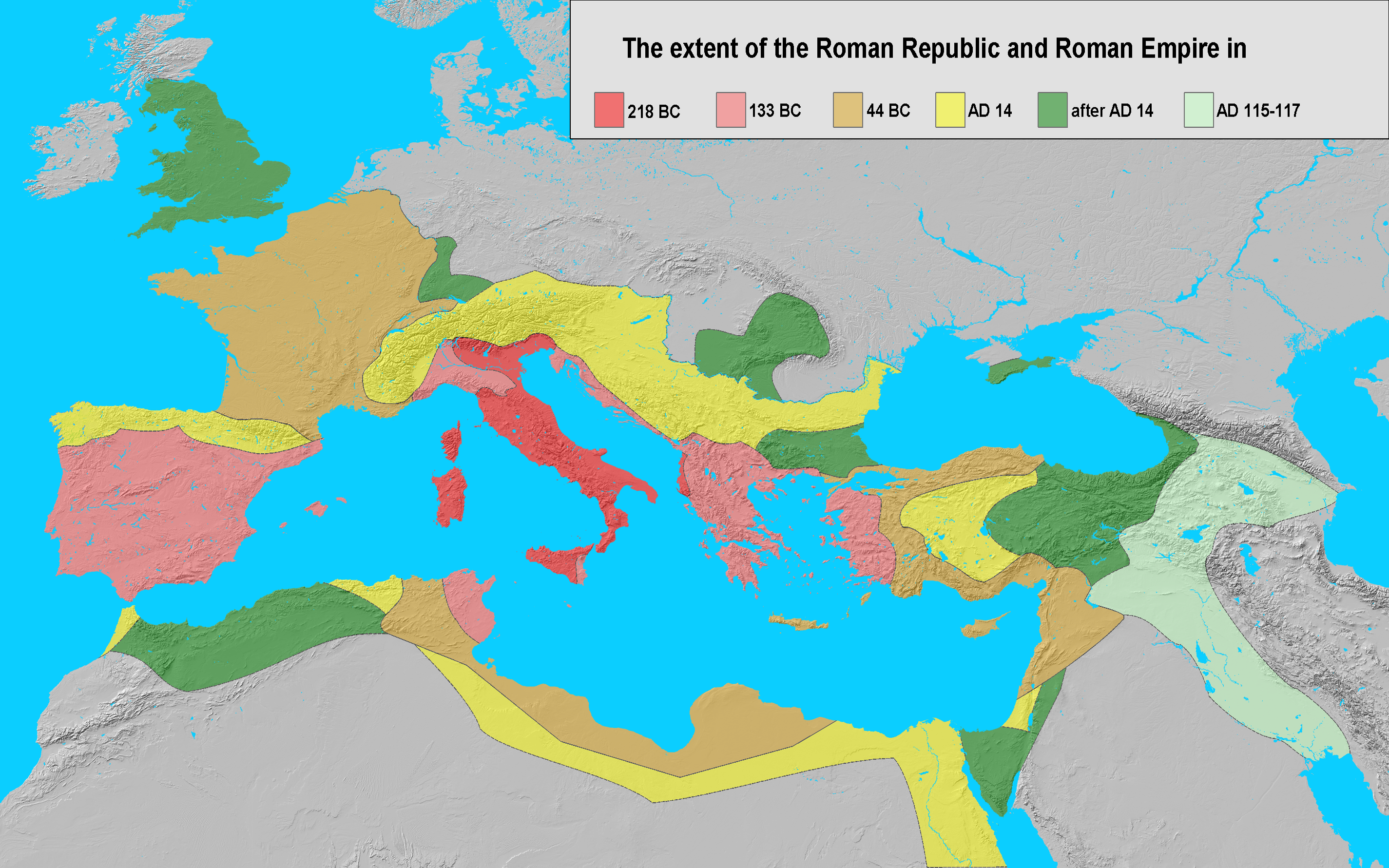
The extent of the Roman Republic and Roman Empire in 218 BC (dark red), 133 BC (light red), 44 BC (orange), 14 AD (yellow), after 14 AD (green), and maximum extension under Trajan 117 (light green).

The Republican period of Ancient Rome began with the overthrow of the Monarchy circa 509 BC and lasted more than 450 years until its subversion through a series of civil wars, into the Principate form of government and the Imperial period. During the half millennium of the Republic, Rome increased from a regional power of the Latium to the dominant force in Italy and beyond. The unification of Italy by the Romans was a gradual process, brought about by a series of conflicts of the 4th and 3rd centuries, the Samnite Wars, Latin War, and Pyrrhic War. Roman victory in the Punic Wars and Macedonian Wars established Rome as a super-regional power by the 2nd century BC, followed by the acquisition of Greece and Asia Minor. This tremendous increase of power was accompanied by economic instability and social unrest, resulting in the Catiline conspiracy, the Social War and the First Triumvirate, and finally the transformation to the Roman Empire during the latter half of the 1st century BC.

=== Roman Empire (1st century BC to 5th century AD) ===
The extent of the Roman Empire under Trajan, AD 117.

The precise end of the Republic is disputed by modern historians; (Note: The precise event which signaled the transition of the Roman Republic into the Roman Empire is a matter of interpretation. Historians have proposed the appointment of Julius Caesar as perpetual dictator (February 44 BC), the Battle of Actium (2 September 31 BC), and the Roman Senate's grant of Octavian's extraordinary powers by the first settlement (16 January 27 BC), as candidates for the defining event.) Roman citizens of the time did not recognize that the Republic had ceased to exist. The early Julio-Claudian Emperors maintained that the res publica still existed, albeit protected by their extraordinary powers, and would eventually return to its earlier Republican form. The Roman state continued to term itself a res publica as long as it continued to use Latin as its official language.

Rome acquired imperial character de facto from the 130s BC with the acquisition of Cisalpine Gaul, Illyria, Greece and Hispania, and definitely with the addition of Iudaea, Asia Minor and Gaul during the 1st century BC. At the time of the empire's maximal extension during the reign of Trajan (AD 117), Rome controlled the entire Mediterranean as well as Gaul, parts of Germania and Britannia, the Balkans, Dacia, Asia Minor, the Caucasus, and Mesopotamia.

Culturally, the Roman Empire was significantly Hellenized, but also incorporated syncretic "eastern" traditions, such as Mithraism, Gnosticism, and most notably Christianity.

Classical Rome had vast differences within their family life compared to the Greeks. Fathers had great power over their children, and husbands over their wives. In fact, the word family, familia in Latin, actually referred to those who were subject to the authority of a male head of household. This included non-related members such as slaves and servants. By marriage, both men and women shared property. Divorce was allowed first during the first century BC and could be done by either man or woman.

=== Late antiquity (4th to 6th centuries AD) ===
The Western and Eastern Roman Empires by 476

The Byzantine Empire in 650 after the Arabs conquered the provinces of Syria and Egypt. At the same time early Slavs settled in the Balkans.

The Roman Empire began to weaken as a result of the crisis of the third century. During Late antiquity Christianity became increasingly popular, finally ousting the Roman imperial cult with the Theodosian decrees of 393. Successive invasions of Germanic tribes finalized the weakening of the Western Roman Empire during the 5th century, while the Eastern Roman Empire persisted throughout the Middle Ages, in a state called Romania by its citizens, and designated the Byzantine Empire by later historians. Hellenistic philosophy was succeeded by the continued development of Platonism and Epicureanism, with Neoplatonism in due course influencing the theology of the Christian Church Fathers.

Many writers have attempted to name a specific date for the symbolic "end" of antiquity, with the most prominent dates being the deposing of the last Western Roman Emperor in 476, the closing of the last Platonic Academy in Athens by the Eastern Roman emperor Justinian I in 529, and the conquest of much of the Mediterranean by the new Muslim faith from 634 to 718. These Muslim conquests, of Syria (637), Egypt (639), Cyprus (654), North Africa (665), Hispania (718), Southern Gaul (720), Crete (820), Sicily (827), Malta (870), as well as the sieges of the Eastern Roman capital (first in 674–78 and then in 717–718) severed the economic, cultural, and political links that had traditionally united the classical cultures around the Mediterranean, ending antiquity (see Pirenne Thesis).

The original Roman Senate continued to express decrees into the late 6th century, and the last Eastern Roman emperor to use Latin as the language of his court in Constantinople was emperor Maurice, who reigned until 602. The overthrow of Maurice by his mutinying Danube army commanded by Phocas resulted in the Slavic invasion of the Balkans and the weakening of Balkan and Greek urban culture (resulting in the flight of Balkan Latin speakers to the mountains, see Origin of the Romanians), and also provoked the Byzantine–Sasanian War of 602–628 in which all the great eastern cities except Constantinople were lost. The resulting turmoil did not end until the Muslim conquests of the 7th century finalized the irreversible loss of all the largest Eastern Roman imperial cities besides the capital itself. The emperor Heraclius in Constantinople, who reigned during this period, conducted his court in Greek, not Latin, though Greek had always been an administrative language of the eastern Roman regions. Eastern-Western associations weakened with the ending of the Byzantine Papacy.

The Eastern Roman Empire's capital city Constantinople remained the only unconquered large urban site of the original Roman Empire, as well as being the largest city in Europe. Yet many classical books, sculptures, and technologies survived there along with classical Roman cuisine and scholarly traditions, well into the Middle Ages, when much of it was "rediscovered" by visiting Western crusaders. Indeed, the inhabitants of Constantinople continued to refer to themselves as Romans, as did their eventual conquerors in 1453, the Ottomans (see Romaioi and Rûm.) The classical scholarship and culture that was still preserved in Constantinople were brought by refugees fleeing its conquest in 1453 and helped to begin the Renaissance (see Greek scholars in the Renaissance).

Ultimately, it was a slow, complex, and graduated change of the socio-economic structure in European history that resulted in the changeover between classical antiquity and medieval society and no specific date can truly exemplify that.

== Political revivalism ==
In politics, the late Roman conception of the Empire as a universal state, commanded by one supreme divinely appointed ruler, united with Christianity as a universal religion likewise headed by a supreme patriarch, proved very influential, even after the disappearance of imperial authority in the West. This tendency reached its maximum when Charlemagne was crowned "Roman Emperor" in the year 800, an act which resulted in the formation of the Holy Roman Empire. The notion that an emperor is a monarch who outranks a king dates from this period. In this political ideal, there would always be a Roman Empire, a state the jurisdiction of which extended through the entire civilized western world.

That model continued to exist in Constantinople for the entirety of the Middle Ages, where the Byzantine Emperor was considered the sovereign of the entire Christian world. The Patriarch of Constantinople was the Empire's highest-ranked cleric, but even he was subordinate to the emperor, who was "God's Viceregent on Earth". The Greek-speaking Byzantines and their descendants continued to call themselves "Romioi" until the creation of a new Greek state in 1832.

After the capture of Constantinople in 1453, the Russian Czars (a title derived from Caesar) claimed the Byzantine legacy as the champion of Orthodoxy; Moscow was described as the "Third Rome", and the Czars ruled as divinely appointed Emperors into the 20th century.

Despite the fact that the Western Roman secular authority disappeared entirely in Europe, it still left traces. The Papacy and the Catholic Church in particular maintained Latin language, culture, and literacy for centuries; to this day the popes are termed Pontifex Maximus which during the classical period was a title belonging to the emperor, and the ideal of Christendom continued the legacy of a united European civilization even after its political unity had ended.

The political idea of an Emperor in the West to match the Emperor in the East continued after the Western Roman Empire's collapse; it was revived by the coronation of Charlemagne in 800; the self-described Holy Roman Empire ruled central Europe until 1806.

The Renaissance idea that the classical Roman virtues had been lost as a result of medievalism was especially powerful in European politics of the 18th and 19th centuries. Reverence for Roman republicanism was strong among the Founding Fathers of the United States and the Latin American revolutionaries; the Americans described their new government as a republic (from res publica) and gave it a Senate and a President (another Latin term), rather than use available English terms like commonwealth or parliament.

Similarly in Revolutionary and Napoleonic France, republicanism and Roman martial virtues were promoted by the state, as can be seen in the architecture of the Panthéon, the Arc de Triomphe, and the paintings of Jacques-Louis David. During the revolution, France transitioned from kingdom to republic to dictatorship to Empire (complete with Imperial Eagles), a process that the Romans had experienced centuries earlier.

== Cultural legacy ==
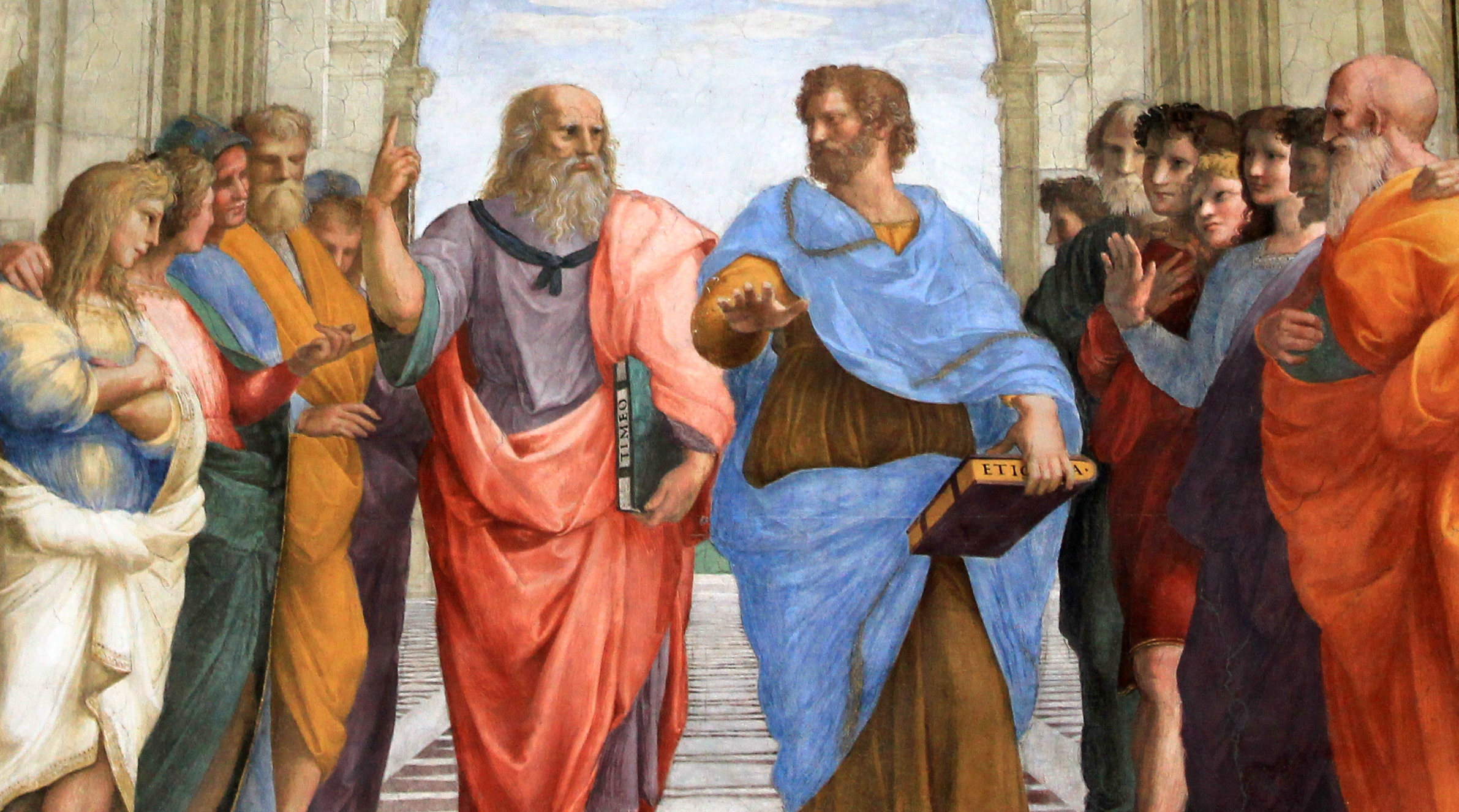
Plato and Aristotle walking and disputing. Detail from Raphael's The School of Athens (1509–1511).

Classical antiquity is a general term for a long period of cultural history. Such a wide sampling of history and territory covers many rather disparate cultures and periods. "Classical antiquity" often refers to an idealized vision of later people, of what was, in Edgar Allan Poe's words, "the glory that was Greece, the grandeur that was Rome!" During the 18th and 19th centuries AD, reverence for classical antiquity was much greater in Europe and the United States than it is now. Respect for the ancient people of Greece and Rome affected politics, philosophy, sculpture, literature, theatre, education, architecture, and sexuality.

Epic poetry in Latin continued to be written and circulated well into the 19th century. John Milton and even Arthur Rimbaud received their first poetic educations in Latin. Genres like epic poetry, pastoral verse, and the frequent use of characters and themes from Greek mythology affected Western literature greatly. In architecture, there have been several Greek Revivals, which seem more inspired in retrospect by Roman architecture than Greek. Washington, DC has many large marble buildings with façades made to look like Greek temples, with columns constructed in the classical orders of architecture.

The philosophy of St. Thomas Aquinas was derived largely from that of Aristotle, despite the intervening change in religion from Hellenic Polytheism to Christianity. Greek and Roman authorities such as Hippocrates and Galen formed the basis of the practice of medicine even longer than Greek thought prevailed in philosophy. In the French theater, playwrights such as Molière and Racine wrote plays on mythological or classical historical subjects and subjected them to the strict rules of the classical unities derived from Aristotle's Poetics. The desire to dance in a manner allegedly similar to the manner of the ancient Greeks caused Isadora Duncan to create her brand of ballet.

== See also ==
- Classical architecture
- Classical tradition
- Classics (Classical education)
- Outline of classical studies
  - Outline of ancient Egypt
  - Outline of ancient Greece
  - Outline of ancient Rome
- Post-classical history (the next period)

Regions during classical antiquity

- Hellenistic Greece
- History of the Balkans
- Roman Dacia
- Troy
