= Triakontaschoinos =

Part of ancient Lower Nubia

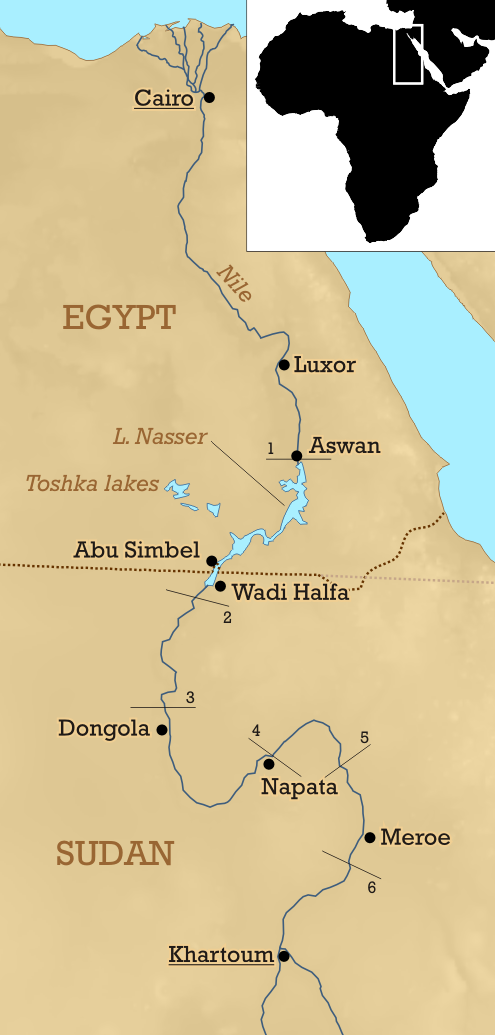
Map of the Lower Nile valley; the Triakontaschoinos is the area between the first cataract (1) and the second (2). Note that Lake Nasser did not exist until the construction of the Aswan Dam in the 1960s–1970s.

The Triakontaschoinos (Greek: Τριακοντάσχοινος, "Land of the Thirty Schoinoi"), Latinized as Triacontaschoenus, was a geographical and administrative term used in the Greco-Roman world for the part of Lower Nubia between the First and Second Cataracts of the Nile, which formed a buffer zone between Egypt and later Rome on the one hand and Meroë on the other hand. The northern part of this area, stretching from the First Cataract south to Maharraqa, was known as the Dodekaschoinos or Dodecaschoenus (Δωδεκάσχοινος, "Land of the Twelve Schoinoi"). In the Ptolemaic and Roman periods the Dodekaschoinos was often annexed to Egypt or controlled from it, and the rest of the Triakontaschoinos sometimes was as well.

In 275 or 274 BC, Ptolemy II (r. 283–246 BC) sent an army to Nubia, and defeated the Kingdom of Kush. The expedition pursued several objectives: on the one hand, it curbed Kushite power, which had been steadily expanding for the past century, and helped secure Ptolemaic rule against the native Egyptians of Upper Egypt, who might be tempted to seek Kushite aid in their revolts. In addition, the expedition secured the Ptolemies' control of the supply route for African elephants, which played a crucial role as war elephants in their conflicts with the rival Seleucid Empire, that monopolized access to the larger Indian elephants. As a result of this campaign, the area between the First and Second Cataracts of the Nile, which also included the valuable gold mines of the Eastern Desert, was annexed to Egypt and became later known as Triakontaschoinos.

Already under Ptolemy II, the northern portion of the new province, between the First Cataract and modern Maharraqa (Greek: Hiera Sykaminos), was designated as the Dodekaschoinos, and all its incomes were dedicated to the temple of the goddess Isis at Philae. This gift was confirmed again by Ptolemy IV (r. 221–204 BC) and Ptolemy VI (r. 180–145 BC). Ptolemy IV also undertook the construction of temples to Thoth at Pselkis (Dakka) and the local Nubian deity Mandulis at Talmis (Kalabsha), as well as the enlargement, or wholesale reconstruction, of a temple dedicated to Arensnuphis at Philae. These buildings were not only statements of royal power, but, in their effort to assimilate local Nubian deities into the Egyptian pantheon, also served to consolidate Ptolemaic rule. As part of this policy, the Ptolemies also granted special privileges and exemptions to the Egyptians of Philae and Elephantine.

Ptolemaic control over Lower Nubia collapsed c. 205 BC, as a result of the revolt of Hugronaphor, which led to the secession of Upper Egypt. Lower Nubia was apparently reoccupied by the Kushites, to whom Hugronaphor turned for aid. Despite Kushite aid, in August 186 BC, the Ptolemaic army defeated the forces of Hugronaphor's successor Chaonnophris and his Kushite allies, and Ptolemaic rule was re-established over Upper Egypt and Lower Nubia. Like the Ptolemies, during this period, the Kushite kings Arqamani and Adikhalamani completed the building projects begun by Ptolemy IV, and celebrated their restoration of Kushite rule by inscriptions, the foundation of the Temple of Debod, and the adoption of elaborate titularies. The same period also saw the increased Egyptianization of the Nubian pantheon under the influence of the priests of Philae, and the adoption of Greek artistic motifs, including nude figures, and of the Greco-Egyptian metric system alongside the traditional Nubian one.

Ptolemy V personally travelled to Philae in 185 BC, with Queen Cleopatra I and the infant Ptolemy VI. Both rulers paid attention to and patronized the local cults as a means of preventing a new rebellion. In 157 BC, Ptolemy VI renewed the donation of the incomes of the entire Dodekaschoinos to the Temple of Isis. Administratively, Ptolemaic Lower Nubia was part of the province of the strategos of the Thebaid, whose most important local representative was the phrourarchos (garrison commander) at Syene until c. 143 BC (or perhaps 135 BC), when it became part of the civilian province (nomos) of Peri Elephantinen. The first civilian governor was the former phrourarchos Herodes, son of Demophon, whose career also exemplifies the close links of the local administration with the temples, which lasted into the Roman period: alongside his public offices, this Greek official was also a priest of Amun, and keeper of the sacred vestments at Elephantine, Bigeh, and Philae. Based on a stela in the temple of Mandulis at Philae, it appears that the native, non-Egyptian population ("Aethiopians", i.e., Nubians) was placed under the authority of a native governor, and was obliged to provide the temple (and by extension probably all temples in the region) with provisions.

The lack of Ptolemaic inscriptions or other evidence of Ptolemaic control has led modern scholars to conclude that by the reign of Ptolemy IX Lathyros (r. 116–109 and 88–81 BC), if not already around the middle of the 2nd century BC, most of the Triakontaschoinos, south of Debod, had been lost to the Ptolemies.

Under Roman rule emperor Augustus reorganized the Dodekaschoinos but maintained the Ptolemaic donation of its incomes to the temple of Isis at Philae. In the third century, the Roman Dodekaschoinos was dominated by local Nubian priestly dynasties such as the Wayekiye, who acted as conduits of increasing Kushite influence in the area. When its gold mines declined, the Romans abandoned the Dodekaschoinos in AD 298 under Diocletian. The Kushite king Yesebokheamani took control of the region and its defence against the Blemmyes, even visiting the temple at Philae as a pilgrim.

By the fifth century AD, in line with the fall of the kingdom of Meroe and the upcoming of Nobatia, the terms Triakontaschoinos and Dodekaschoinos are no longer in use.

== Bibliography ==
- Bevan, Edwyn Robert (1927). A History of Egypt Under the Ptolemaic Dynasty. Methuen. OCLC 876137911.
- Török, László (1997). The Kingdom of Kush: Handbook of the Napatan-Meroitic Civilization. Leiden, New York, Köln: Brill. ISBN 90-04-10448-8.
- Török, László (2009). Between Two Worlds: The Frontier Region Between Ancient Nubia and Egypt, 3700 BC-AD 500. Leiden, New York, Köln: Brill. ISBN 978-90-04-17197-8.
