= Tanyidamani =

King of Meroë

- Tanyidamani
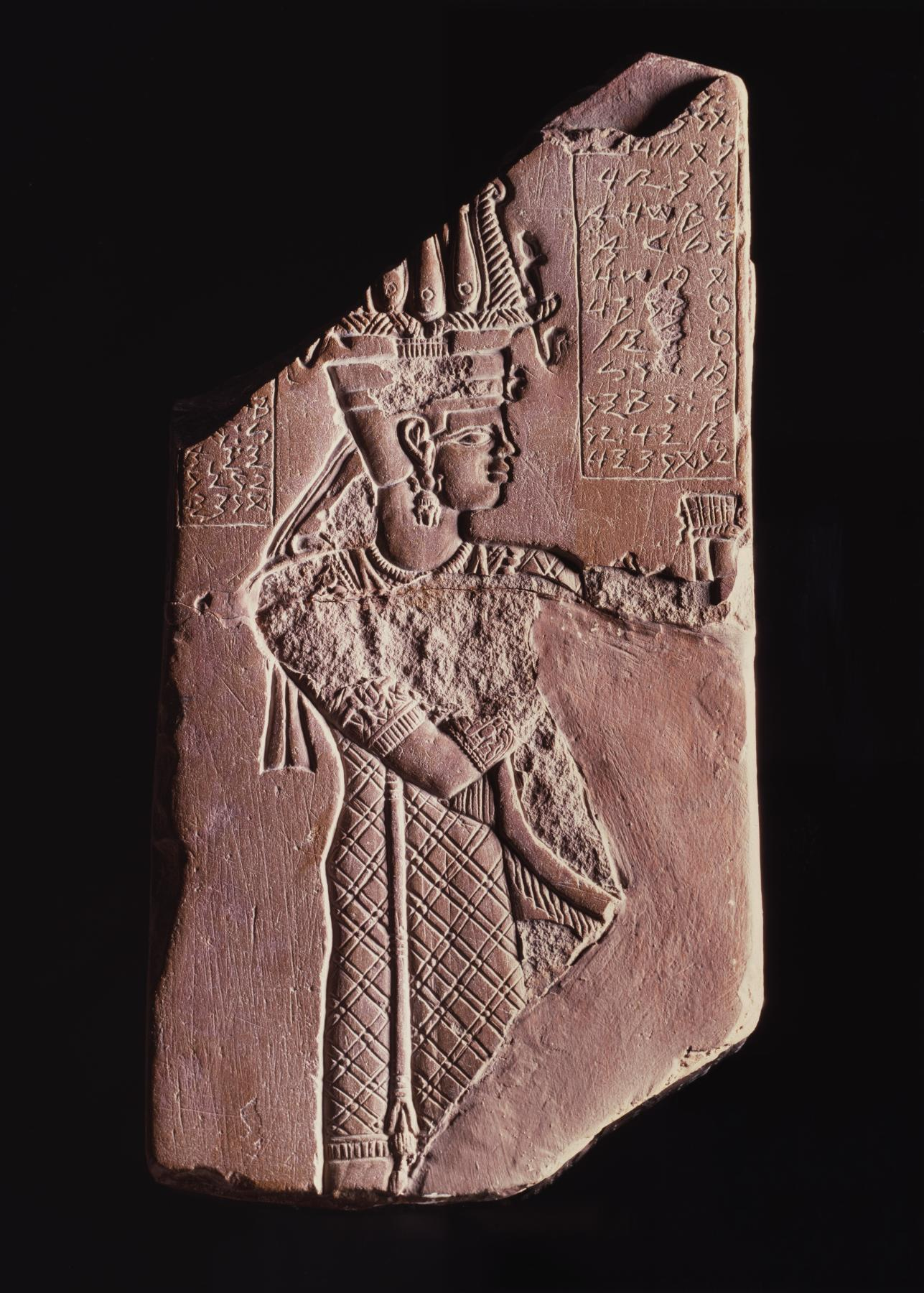
- Votive Plaque of Tanyidamani, Walters Art Museum

Kushite King of Meroë
- Reign: c. 150-100 BCE
- Predecessor: Nahirqo
- Successor: Pakhedateqo (?)
Royal titulary
Prenomen
Tanyidamani
Nomen
Tanyidamani
- Born: c. 2nd century BCE
- Died: c. 100 BCE

Tanyidamani was a Kushite king of Meroë who ruled in the second half of the 2nd century BCE. He was most likely the son of king Adikhalamani and Queen Nahirqo.

Tanyidamani is known by some objects, the most remarkable among these is a large stele from Jebel Barkal: it is the longest known text in the Meroitic language. Another smaller, red siltstone stele was found in the temple of Apedemak at Meroë, and is now at the Walters Art Museum.

On a bronze cylinder found at Jebel Barkal both his throne name and personal name are given in Hieroglyphics, but these are identical: Tanyidamani. The Meroitic inscriptions only mention one name and it seems that the original Egyptian royal titulary composed of five names was apparently abandoned with the introduction of the Meroitic language and alphabet. The only term used in this simplified titulary is Qore which probably means "king".

No pyramid can be securely attributed to Tanyidamani, though he has been proposed to have been buried in Beg. N 12, which is from the generation immediately after Beg. N 11 (Nahirqo's burial). The chronologically next known Kushite king is Pakhedateqo, who is thus placed as Tanyidamani's potantial successor.

| Preceded by: Nahirqo | Rulers of Kush | Succeeded by: Pakhedateqo |
