= Great Theban Revolt =

Egyptian revolt against the Ptolemaic Kingdom

Date	206–186 BC
Location	Upper Egypt
Result	Ptolemaic victory

Belligerents
Egyptian rebels	Ptolemaic Kingdom

Commanders and leaders
Haronnophris; Chaonnophris	Ptolemy IV Philopator; Ptolemy V Epiphanes

The Great Theban Revolt was an uprising in the Thebaid at the end of the 3rd century BC against the authority of the Ptolemaic dynasty which then controlled Egypt. Unlike other revolts rapidly suppressed by the Ptolemies, this revolt stands out due to its long duration and its spread across a large part of Upper Egypt. The Great Theban Revolt is also notable for the establishment of an actual state, based on the institutions of pharaonic Egypt, with its leaders even being crowned pharaoh. After twenty years of existence, the pharaonic state created during this uprising was defeated by the Ptolemies, who regained total control over Egypt.

== Background ==
In 332 BC, Alexander the Great liberated Egypt from Persian occupation and integrated the country into his immense empire. Upon Alexander's death in 323 BC, the empire was divided into several satrapies, and Egypt found itself at the heart of the territory controlled by the diadochus Ptolemy, one of Alexander's generals. In 305 BC, Ptolemy founded the Ptolemaic Kingdom as Ptolemy I Soter. His successors would be crowned pharaohs and would strive throughout their reigns to present the Ptolemaic state as the direct and legitimate continuity of pharaonic Egypt. This was reflected in particular by a closer relationship with the Egyptian clergy and the restoration or expansion of temples damaged during the Persian occupation. Nevertheless, the Ptolemaic state adopted a Greek system of operation, with strong military control over the territory and the exclusion of Egyptians from positions of responsibility at both national and local levels.

== Events of the revolt ==
=== Origin ===
The rule of the Ptolemies was marked by a series of revolts directed against royal power. These can be explained by a combination of political-religious, identity, and socio-economic factors. This last element seems to have been predominant during the Great Theban Revolt, because the end of the Fourth Syrian War, although won by Ptolemy IV, left the country in a catastrophic financial situation. A fiscal and monetary reform, including the devaluation of copper currency and a considerable increase in taxes, was therefore decided upon to refill the kingdom's coffers. In addition, the end of the war was accompanied by the massive demobilization of soldiers engaged in the conflict, destabilizing the organization of society. The famous account by the Greek historian Polybius (a contemporary of the revolt) according to which the uprising was led by demobilized Egyptian soldiers returning from the Battle of Raphia is today widely rejected by historians. The local factor can be added to the causes of the uprising. Despite the installation of the Ptolemaic monarchs in Alexandria, the city of Thebes, the capital of Egypt for centuries and the center of the cult of the god Amun, still enjoyed immense prestige. Ptolemy IV's attempt to tighten his authority over the Theban region thus ran into the region's long-standing autonomist aspirations. Finally, the existence of a certain anti-Greek sentiment within the Egyptian population must also be mentioned.

=== Chronology ===
Although unrest broke out in Upper Egypt between 207 and 206 BC, the revolt did not truly begin until the autumn of 206 BC, when Egyptian rebels seized the Temple of Edfu. The capture of Edfu was a significant event, as the temple represented a symbol of Ptolemaic power in Upper Egypt. The rebels then fortified the temple and used it as a bastion. The Egyptian rebels then marched on Thebes, conquered the city, and drove out the Greeks. In the autumn of 205 BC, the leader of the revolt was crowned pharaoh in Thebes as Haronnophris (the Horus Onnophris), beloved of Isis and Amun-Ra, a regnal name full of symbolism, even messianic. Of all the Egyptian revolts against the Ptolemaic dynasty, the Great Theban Revolt was the only one whose leaders went so far as to bear the title of pharaoh.

The rebellion continued to spread in Upper Egypt and, unlike previous revolts, was not immediately suppressed. This can be explained by a series of unexpected events that permanently weakened Ptolemaic power. King Ptolemy IV died unexpectedly the following year, while his son and successor Ptolemy V was still a young child. The latter's mother, Queen Arsinoe III, acted as regent for a time before being assassinated by her advisors, who seized power. Protests by the population of Alexandria quickly turned into riots, while abroad the Seleucid Empire took advantage of the weakness of the central power to declare war on the Ptolemaic Kingdom and seize Coele-Syria. Egypt itself escaped invasion thanks to the intervention of the Roman Senate, which nevertheless forced the Ptolemies to cede their possessions in the Near East.

Meanwhile, the rebel pharaoh extended his grip over the south of the country. The exact extent of his sphere of influence is unknown but stretched at least from Abydos (170 kilometres (110 mi) north of Thebes) to Per-Hathor (30 kilometres (19 mi) south of Thebes). The temples of Abydos were transformed into fortresses to secure the city, which marked the northern border of the rebel territory. From Abydos, the Egyptians were able to launch raids on the Greek city of Ptolemais, forty kilometers to the north. Haronnophris then ruled over a territory comprising more or less all of Upper Egypt, with the exception of the Greek strongholds of Ptolemais and Aswan. The new pharaoh worked to maintain the continuity of institutions while establishing a new state, rehabilitating ancient titles and positions from pharaonic Egypt. The wealthy Theban temples were probably called upon to contribute, while the Ptolemies ceased to collect revenues from Upper Egypt. Furthermore, symbols of the Greek presence in the region were destroyed, such as the Greek public baths at Karnak or the temple of Medamud. In parallel, the Kingdom of Kush of Meroë took advantage of the situation to invade Egypt and Lower Nubia from the south and take control of all Ptolemaic territories south of Aswan, including the island of Philae. The exact role of the kings of Meroë (Arqamani then Adikhalamani) in the Great Theban Revolt is unknown, but they visibly supported the rebels until the end of the revolt. Another unanswered question is the exact role of the Theban clergy in the insurrection. Given the power of the priests of Amun over the region, it seems highly improbable that the revolt could have lasted so long without the support of the clergy. Indeed, the rebel pharaohs heavily emphasized the patronage of the clergy of Amun to legitimize their accession to the throne. Nevertheless, the hypothesis of the clergy joining forces with the rebels to obtain independence for the cult of Amun is today widely dismissed. Indeed, the absence of reprisals by the Ptolemies against the priests at the end of the revolt rules out their having played a leading role in the movement. It could be that the priests simply accommodated themselves to the situation, supporting one side or the other depending on the balance of power.

The counter-offensive of the Ptolemaic army finally took place between 200 and 199 BC. After a long siege, the rebels were driven from Abydos in the summer of 199 BC. The decisive battle took place near Coptos some time later. Haronnophris and the Egyptians were defeated. The troops of Ptolemy V captured Thebes in December 199 BC. The defeat of the insurgents was marked by the disappearance of Haronnophris and the appearance of a new pharaoh, named Chaonnophris ("Onnophris lives" or "May Onnophris live"), even before the capture of Thebes. The generally accepted hypothesis is that Haronnophris was killed or captured at the Battle of Coptos and then replaced by a successor. However, some evidence suggests that Haronnophris and Chaonnophris might be one and the same person who changed his regnal name to celebrate having survived the battle.

The counter-offensive of Ptolemy V initially appeared to be a great success. The king took the opportunity to be officially crowned in Alexandria and then in Memphis. It was on this occasion that the Decree of Memphis (found on the Rosetta Stone) was published, promulgating a series of reforms and amnesties for prisoners. Nevertheless, the insurrection continued, and Chaonnophris regained control of the Thebaid around 197 BC. In the following years, the territory controlled by the Egyptian rebels expanded northward, well beyond the territory controlled by Haronnophris a few years earlier, reaching the city of Asyut. The surroundings of Asyut then became a zone of violent clashes between rebel and loyalist forces, particularly between 195 and 191 BC, causing havoc among the population.

The Ptolemaic army, commanded by a certain Ptolemaios, gained the upper hand in 191 BC and broke through enemy lines. It then progressed southward and retook control of Thebes the same year. Another Greek named Protarchos was appointed head of the new Ptolemaic administration in Thebes, while Ptolemaios fortified the Thebaid and continued to confront the rebels. Against all expectations, the central power's reassertion of control over the region was not accompanied by bloody reprisals, but by genuine reforms aimed at better associating Egyptians with central power. However, Ptolemaios failed to permanently quell the revolt, and he was eventually replaced by another general, Komanos, who arrived in Thebes in March 187 BC at the head of a new Ptolemaic army. A sign that the Ptolemaic power took the gravity of the revolt seriously, Komanos was probably an epistrategos, a newly created title for a military officer with extensive powers over the troops but also over the local administration. Komanos thus spent the following months organizing his army and supply lines ahead of a major battle.

On August 27, 186 BC, the Ptolemaic army commanded by Komanos faced the rebel army led by Chaonnophris somewhere south of Aswan. Although the rebel army was reinforced by Nubian troops, it was hardly prepared to face a professional army in a pitched battle. The rebel pharaoh Chaonnophris and his army were defeated. Chaonnophris himself was captured, while his son and the Nubian leaders were killed in the battle. Chaonnophris's decision to directly confront the Greek troops appears to be an obvious strategic error, but it can be explained by the erosion of the rebel movement after the loss of Thebes, which would have forced him to risk everything. In addition, the presence of Nubian reinforcements may have generated a certain emulation and convinced the pharaoh that victory was possible. In any case, the defeat of Chaonnophris put a definitive end to the Great Theban Revolt. The rebel pharaoh Chaonnophris was brought back to Memphis and executed.

== Aftermath ==
The Great Theban Revolt was a landmark event in the history of the Ptolemaic Kingdom. Within the borders of Egypt itself, it was the clearest sign of the collapse of Ptolemaic power at the end of the 3rd century BC, a collapse that would reach its climax with the Egyptian defeats during the Fifth and Sixth Syrian Wars. Although the power of the Ptolemies was never truly threatened by the Theban rebels, the Great Revolt appears as a turning point for the Ptolemaic monarchy. Indeed, the catastrophic situation of the kingdom at the beginning of the 2nd century BC forced the monarchy to try to conciliate the Egyptian population — previously considered solely as a source of tax revenue — notably through the Egyptian clergy. From the reign of Ptolemy V onward, successive Ptolemaic rulers agreed, at least in appearance, to no longer merely rule as Greek basileus but to fully assume the role of pharaoh of Egypt. Nevertheless, despite the concessions granted to the Egyptians, the kingdom would remain largely dominated by a Greco-Macedonian elite, and taxation would continue to weigh heavily on the population.

== Bibliography ==
- Alliot, Maurice (1951). "La Thébaïde en lutte contre les rois d'Alexandrie sous Philopator et Épiphane (216-184)". Revue belge de philologie et d'histoire (in French). 29: 421–443. doi:10.3406/rbph.1951.2096.
- Alliot, Maurice (1952). "La fin de la résistance égyptienne dans le Sud sous Épiphane". Revue des études anciennes (in French). 54: 18–26. doi:10.3406/rea.1952.3465.
- Turner, Eric G. (1984). "Ptolemaic Egypt". The Cambridge Ancient History. Vol. VII, Part 1: The Hellenistic World. Cambridge University Press. doi:10.1017/CHOL9780521234450. ISBN 978-0-521-23445-0.
- Vandorpe, Katelijn (1995). "City of Many a Gate, Harbour for Many a Rebel". Hundred-Gated Thebes: Acts of a Colloquium on Thebes and the Theban Area in the Graeco-Roman Period. Brill. ISBN 9789004103849.
- Will, Édouard (2003). Histoire politique du monde hellénistique (323-30 av. J.-C.) (in French). Paris: Éditions du Seuil. ISBN 978-2020603874.
- Veïsse, Anne-Emmanuelle (2005). "Le discours sur les violences dans l'Égypte hellénistique : le clergé face aux révoltes". La violence dans les mondes grec et romain. Publications de la Sorbonne. ISBN 978-2-85944-530-0.
- Vandorpe, Katelijn (2010). "The Ptolemaic Period". A Companion to Ancient Egypt. Wiley-Blackwell. doi:10.1002/9781444320053. ISBN 9781405155984.
- Veïsse, Anne-Emmanuelle (2013). "Retour sur les 'révoltes égyptiennes'". Topoi. Orient-Occident (in French).
- Fischer-Bovet, Christelle (2014). Army and Society in Ptolemaic Egypt. Cambridge University Press. doi:10.1017/CBO9781139035231. ISBN 978-1107007758.
- Clarysse, Willy (2014). "The Great Revolt of the Egyptians (205-186 BCE)" (PDF). Online exhibits. UC Berkeley: Center for the Tebtunis Papyri.
- Johstono, Paul (2015). "Insurgency in Ptolemaic Egypt". Brill's Companion to Insurgency and Terrorism in the Ancient Mediterranean. Brill. ISBN 978-90-04-22235-9.
- Francigny, Vincent (2016). "The Meroitic Temple at Sai Island". Beiträge zur Sudanforschung.
- Tallet, Pierre; Payraudeau, Frédéric; Ragazzoli, Chloé; Somaglino, Claire (2019). L'Égypte pharaonique: Histoire, société, culture (in French). Armand Colin. ISBN 978-2-200-61753-0.
- Fischer-Bovet, C. (2015). "Social Unrest and Ethnic Coexistence in Ptolemaic Egypt and the Seleucid Empire". Past & Present (229): 3–45. ISSN 0031-2746.
- Veïsse, Anne-Emmanuelle (2022). "The 'Great Theban Revolt', 206–186 BCEs". Cultures of Resistance in the Hellenistic East. Oxford University Press. doi:10.1093/oso/9780192863478.003.0003.
