= OSE class A.551 =

Greek class of diesel-electric locomotive

OSE class Α.551
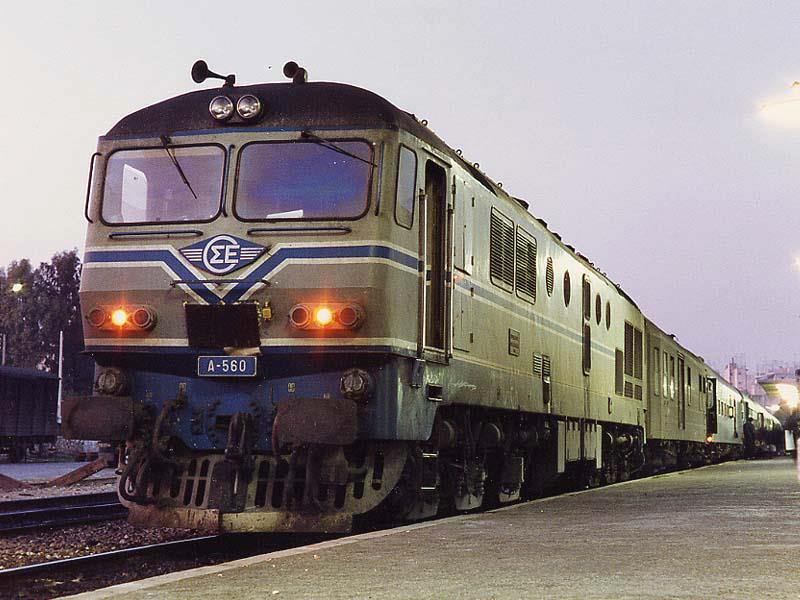
Type and origin
- Power type: Diesel-electric
- Builder: Electroputere
- Build date: 1982
- Total produced: 10
Specifications
- Configuration
  - AAR: Co-Co
- Gauge: 1,435 mm (4 ft 8 1/2 in) standard gauge
- Wheel diameter: 1,100 mm (43 in)
- Height: 4.1 m (13 ft 5 in)
- Transmission: Electric
Performance figures
- Maximum speed: 145 km/h (90 mph)
- Power output: 2,911 kW (3,958 PS; 3,904 hp)
- Tractive effort: 212.2 kN (47,700 lb_{f})
Career
- Operators: OSE
- Disposition: Nine scrapped

OSE class A.551 (also known as LDE 4000 HP) was a class of diesel locomotives, which were used to be a part of Hellenic Railways Organization (OSE)'s rolling stock. It was built in 1982 by Electroputere in Craiova, Romania, by OSE's order. It was usually coupled with a heating coach, for the train's heating needs. In total, 10 units were produced, numbered A.551 to A.560, which had an Alco 251R/V16 engine, with a 2,911-kilowatt (3,958 PS; 3,904 hp) power output, and were capable to reach speeds up to 145 kilometres per hour (90 mph).

These locomotives were nicknamed "Ρουμάνες" (Roumanes, lit. Romanian girls), after their factory location. Its imposing shape, in combination with the great horsepower, made it a portrait of the most powerful locomotive, at its days, in Greece. They were usually performed routes from Athens to Thessaloniki. Along with them, 5 heating coaches, numbered 998.4.001-5 were also delivered.

== History ==
In 1982 OSE made a special order in the Romanian Electroputere (Convention 59037/1980) for 10 special type engines. They had engines by the Romanian Resita, in plans by the American ALCO. Similar engines were delivered on the Romanian, Iranian, British and Chinese railways, as well as others. Although powerful, with the ability to haul many coaches, they had many reliability issues. They were used on Athens-Thessaloniki lines, on most passenger trains, but with the increase of cargo trafficking, they were moved on the heavy cargo trains. Later, they were moved on heavy cargo trains on the Athens-Thessaloniki-Idomeni axis, as well as the Thessaloniki-Komanos and several passenger trains, and also ensured trains to Kozani και Struma. They were withdrawn early from traffic in 1998, just 16 years after their purchase, and were all scrapped, except for Α.557, and only their engines (ALCO 16R 251) were utilized on the diesel-electric MLW class Α.500 locomotives' refit.
