= Tabirqo =

2nd century BCE king of Kush

Kushite King of Meroë
- Reign: First half of the 2nd century BCE
- Predecessor: Adikhalamani (?)
- Successor: Nahirqo (?) or unknown king (Beg. N 10)
Royal titulary
- Burial: Meroë, pyramid Beg. N 9

Tabirqo was a king of Kush, ruling from Meroë in the first half of the 2nd century BCE. Tabirqo's name is known only from his tomb, Beg. N 9 in Meroë.

== Chronology and reconstructions ==
Tabirqo's relationship with the king Adikhalamani, known from inscriptions at Philae from roughly the same time, has been variously reconstructed. No burial of Adikhalamani can be securely identified. George Andrew Reisner (1923) suggested that Tabirqo was a "funerary name" of Adikhalamani and that they were thus one and the same king. This identification has been maintained by some scholars, such as László Török (2015). Claude Rilly (2017) and Josefine Kuckertz (2021) instead proposed that Adikhalamani was the same king as (...)mr(...)t, a name fragmentarily preserved in the temporally close tomb Beg. N 8, and that Tabirqo was a distinct succeeding king. Under the earlier reconstruction (...)mr(...)t is seen as a separate king who succeeded Adikhalamani.

Nahirqo, the former consort of (...)mr(...)t (thus perhaps Adikhalamani), ruled as queen regnant after Tabirqo, which suggests that Tabirqo may have died early. Nahirqo may have directly succeeded Tabirqo or was perhaps also preceded by an additional unknown king, known only from the unfinished burial Beg. N 10 from around this time.
