= Nahirqo =

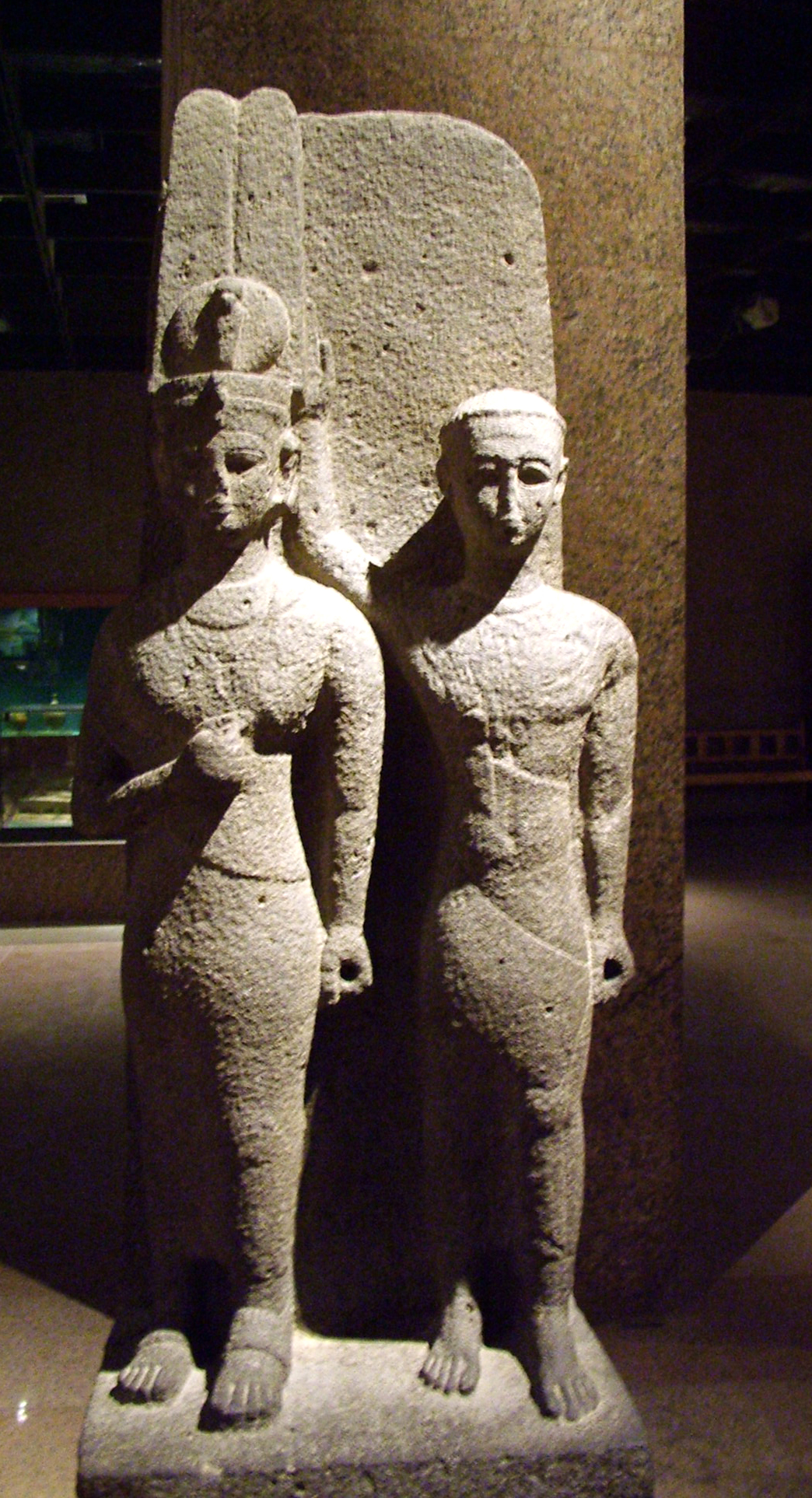
- Double statue depicting a Kushite queen regnant (left) and an unknown male associate (right), attributed to Nahirqo

Kushite Queen of Meroë
- Reign: Middle 2nd century BC
- Predecessor: Tabirqo (?) or unknown king (Beg. N 10)
- Successor: Tanyidamani
- Consort: Adikhalamani
- Children: Tabirqo (?); Tanyidamani
- Burial: Meroë, pyramid Beg. N 11

Nahirqo is the name attributed to a Kushite queen regnant buried in pyramid Beg N. 11 in Meroë. Nahirqo is the earliest known woman to have ruled the Kingdom of Kush, reigning in the middle second century BC. Prior to her own reign, Nahirqo is believed to have been the queen consort of King Adikhalamani.

The name Shanakdakhete was previously attributed to this queen, though re-assessments have demonstrated that Shanakdakhete reigned much later, in the first half of the first century AD.

== Sources and chronology ==
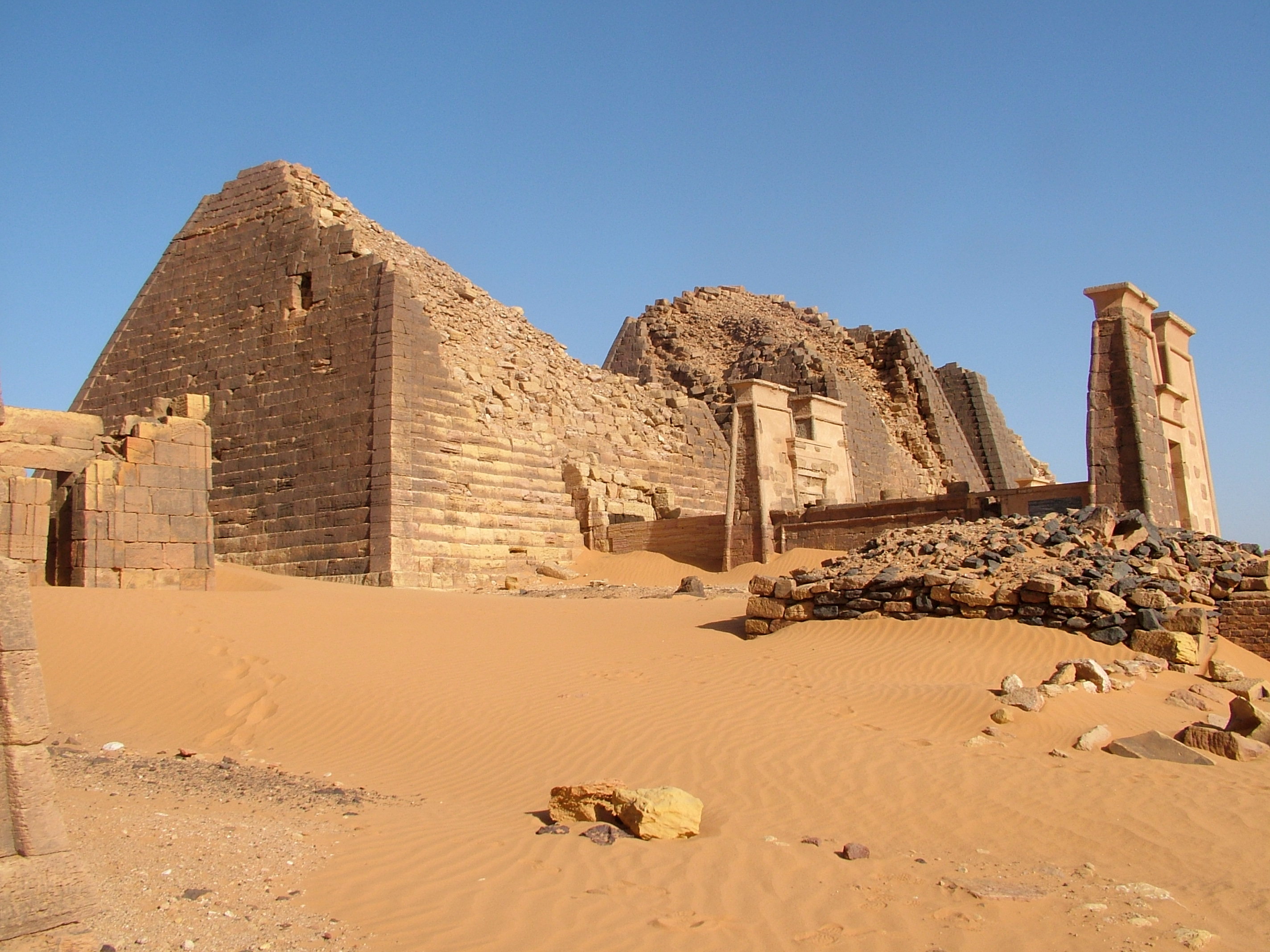
Pyramid Beg. N 11 at Meroë

Nahirqo's name is attested in pyramid Beg. N 8 at Meroë; this pyramid belongs to a king whose name is partially preserved as (...)mr(...)t. This king has been identified with Adikhalamani, who is also attested in inscriptions at Philae. Nahirqo was thus likely the wife of Adikhalamani.

Pyramid Beg. N 11 at Meroë does not preserve the name of the ruler buried, though its iconography identifies the tomb as that of a female monarch. The later king Tanyidamani is conventionally identified as Adikhalamani's son. Tanyidamani is depicted in Beg. N 11 (there named 'T[ne]yi') as performing rituals for his mother, suggesting that the queen buried there is Adikhalamani's wife and thus Nahirqo. Nahirqo has also been identified with a Kushite queen regnant depicted on a double statue, probably originating from a mortuary cult temple in Meroë.

Adikhalamani's direct successor on the Kushite throne was likely Tabirqo, buried in Beg. N 9, who is poorly known and might have died early. It is possible that Nahirqo took the throne either on behalf of another heir who was too young to rule, or that she became queen regnant due to Tabirqo's premature death. Nahirqo's reign is dated to the middle second century BC. Iconographic details from Beg. N 11 suggest that she may have ruled around 145 BC, contemporary with Ptolemy VIII Physcon in Egypt.

== Iconography ==
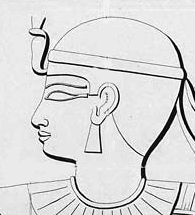
Portrait of the ruler buried in Beg. N 11, identified as Nahirqo

The iconography used in Beg. N 11 and the double statue attributed to Nahirqo represent a woman who is wearing the royal attire and crown otherwise associated only with kings. In one sunken relief in the tomb, the queen is depicted as wearing embellished garments and jewels, and as sitting on a royal seat shaped like a lion, with her left hand raised and her right hand gripping a spear and a palm branch. The tomb also contains reliefs of men holding arrows, a Meroitic burial motif also found in other pyramids.

The double statue pairs Nahirqo with an unidentified male associate, who has a raised arm placed behind the queen's crown. The man is depicted as equally large and was presumably of royal status. He was most likely a non-ruling member of the royal house, inferred through his more modest costume and his simple diadem. It is possible that the statue should be interpreted as showing a transmission of power, designating the man (perhaps a prince) as the future heir to the throne. The Fontes Historiae Nubiorum offers an alternate interpretation, suggesting that the man was an earlier crown prince who died before becoming king and whose rights were then vindicated by the queen.

== Gallery ==
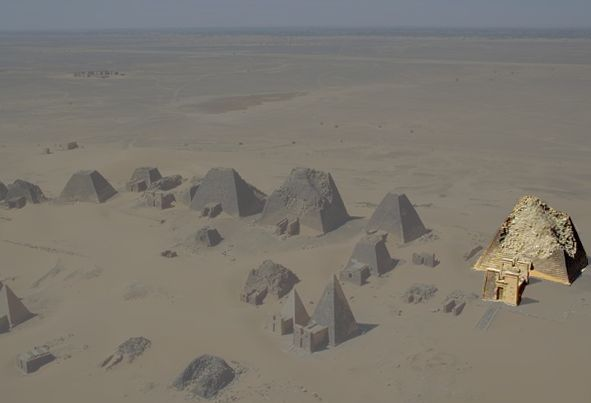
Pyramid Beg. N 11 in relation to nearby pyramids

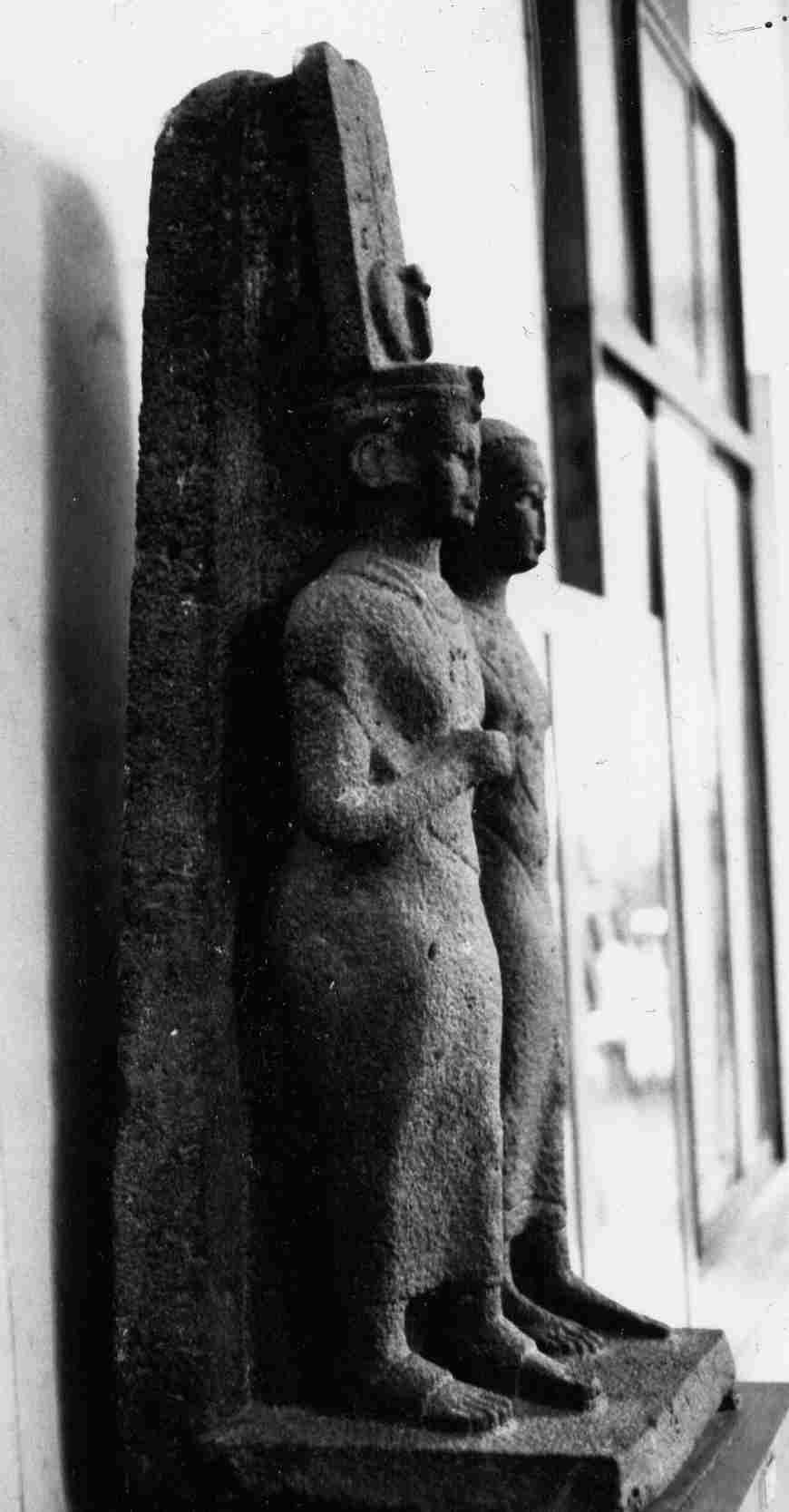
Side-view of the double statue

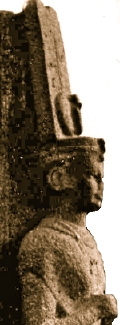
Close-up of the statue

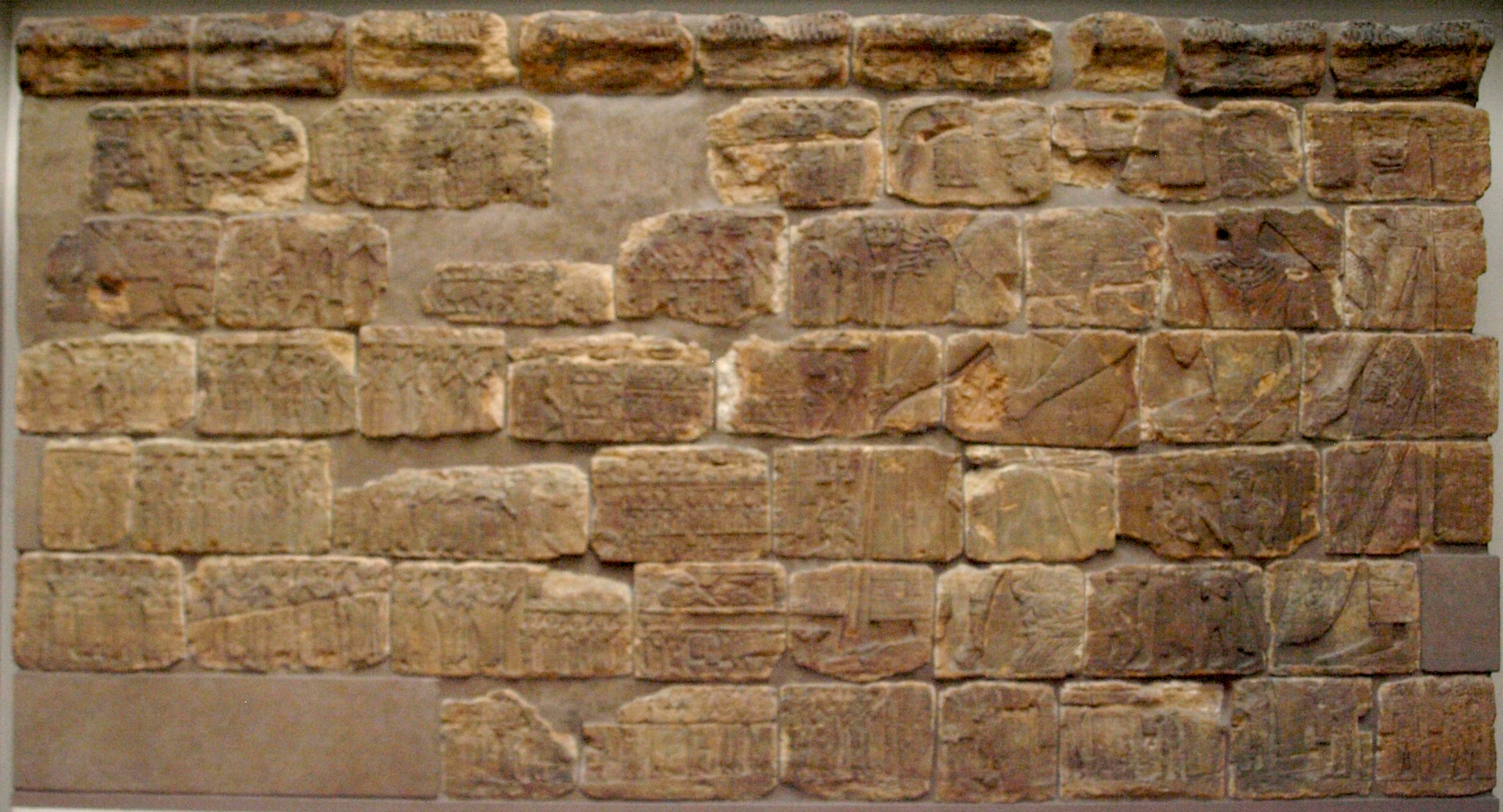
Relief on funerary chapel wall of Beg. N 11

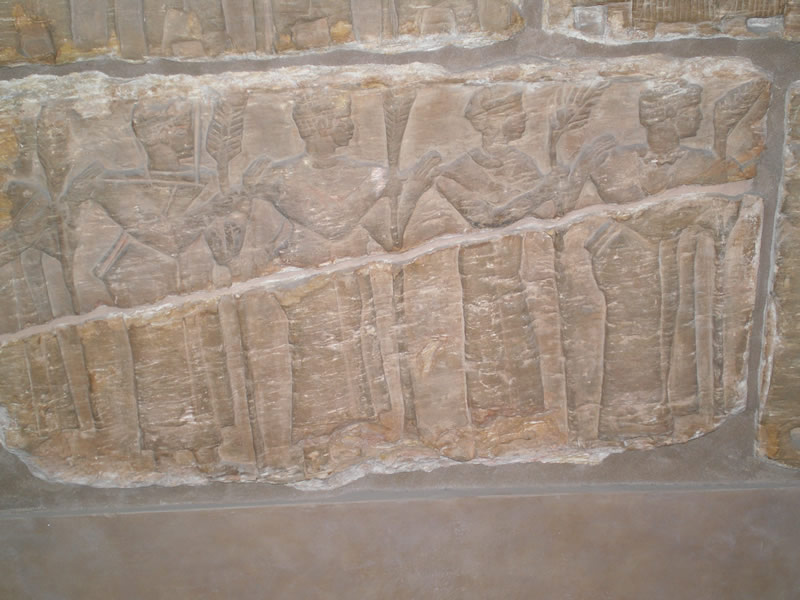
Wall decoration in Beg. N 11

== See also ==
- Kandake
