= Yesebokheamani =

Kushite king

Yesebokheamani (or Amaniyesebokhe) was the king (qore) of Kush in the late 3rd or early 4th century AD. He seems to have been the king who took control of the Dodecaschoenus after the Roman withdrawal in 298. This enabled him to make a personal visit to the temple of Isis at Philae.

The second element in the name Yesebokheamani refers to the god Amun. The meaning of Yesebokhe, which stands alone in other inscriptions, is unknown. The sources sometimes place the Amun-element first. There are many variant renderings of the name in English (Yesbokheamani, Yesbekheamani, Yesboẖe-Amni, Amani-Yeshbêhe).

Yesebokheamani is known from four Meroitic inscriptions. He raised a sandstone dedication stela in the temple of Apedemak in Meroë with an inscription in cursive Meroitic script. This stela was discovered by John Garstang in 1909, but is now lost. The untranslated inscription appears to be a hymn to Apedemak. Several other cults are mentioned in the inscription, including those of Isis at Philae, Sedeinga and Thebes, those of Horus at Philae and Thebes and that of Amun at Napata.

The three other inscriptions are evidence of Yesebokheamani's rule in the Dodecaschoenus. A monumental lion statue was erected at Qasr Ibrim in his honour. It bears an inscription in hieroglyphic Meroitic describing the king as "beloved of Amun of Luxor". Jack Plumley dated it to between 286 and 306. There are two Meroitic graffiti at Philae, on the north and south walls of the passage between Hadrian's Gate (where pilgrims arrived) and the hypostyle. The graffiti are proskynemata to the goddess Isis and were almost certainly carved when the king was there in person as a means of continuing his presence after he left. Below each is "a relief of a king presenting the hieroglyph sekhet," a symbol of the sekhet fields and a traditional representation of the king handing over the Dodecaschoenus to Isis. The image, however, is an earlier Egyptian one "usurped" by Yesebokheamani.

Yesebokheamani's visit to Philae probably took place after the Kushite occupation of the Dodecaschoenus, which affected all the land south of Philae and may have left Philae itself in an ambiguous position for a time. There is archaeological evidence for the Kushite fortification of Kalabsha, presumably as a defence against the raiding Blemmyes.

== Bibliography ==
- Adams, William Yewdale (1977). Nubia, Corridor to Africa. Princeton University Press.
- Ashby, Solange (2016). Calling Out to Isis: The Enduring Nubian Presence at Philae (PDF) (PhD diss.). University of Chicago.
- Barnard, Hans (2005). "Sire, il n'y a pas de Blemmyes: A Re-evaluation of Historical and Archaeological Data". In J. C. M. Starkey (ed.). People of the Red Sea: Proceedings of the Red Sea Project II. BAR International Series. pp. 23–40.
- Hallof, Jochen (2003). "Yesbokheamani—der Löwe von Qasr Ibrim". The Journal of Egyptian Archaeology. 89 (1): 251–254. doi:10.1177/030751330308900117. S2CID 190211168.
- Hatke, George (2013). Aksum and Nubia: Warfare, Commerce, and Political Fictions in Ancient Northeast Africa. New York University Press.
- Plumley, J. M. (1966). "Qasr Ibrim 1966". The Journal of Egyptian Archaeology. 52: 9–12. doi:10.2307/3855813. JSTOR 3855813.
- Török, László (1997). The Kingdom of Kush: Handbook of the Napatan–Meroitic Civilization. Brill.
- Török, László (1998). "276. Yesebokheamani; 277. Meroitic Dedication of Yesebokheamani". In Tormod Eide; Tomas Hägg; Richard Holton Pierce; László Török (eds.). Fontes Historiae Nubiorum. Textual Sources for the History of the Middle Nile Region between the Eighth Century BC and the Sixth Century AD. Vol III: From the First to the Sixth Century AD. Bergen: Institutt for klassisk filologi. pp. 1049–1051.
- Török, László (2009). Between Two Worlds: The Frontier Region Between Ancient Nubia and Egypt, 3700 BC–AD 500. Brill.
- Zibelius-Chen, Karola (2006). "Nubian Kingdoms, Dyn. 25 through the Kingdom of Meroe". In Erik Hornung; Rolf Krauss; David A. Warburton (eds.). Ancient Egyptian Chronology. Brill. pp. 284–303.
