= Wayekiye family =

Ancient Egyptian/Kushite priestly family

The Wayekiye family was a Nubian priestly family that was influential in the Dodekaschoinos between Upper Egypt and Nubia in the second and third centuries CE, named after two of its members. They are attested to by mostly Demotic temple inscriptions. Although the Roman government directed the taxes of the Dodekaschoinos to the Egyptian temple cults of Isis of Philae and Thoth of Dakka, most of the population was not ethnically Egyptian but Nubian, as were local elites like the Wayekiye. The family eventually came to serve the Nubian Kushite court of Meroë and may have acted as a "vehicle for the penetration of Meroitic royal authority" into the area, culminating in Kush's annexation of the area in the third century.

== History ==
Among the earliest known members of the family, Paêse, describes himself in a late second-century adorational text as holding the Nubian titles of qorene and perite ("agent") of the Egyptian goddess Isis. These titles appear to have referred to religious officials who served a central governing body made up of the senior clergy of the Dodekaschoinos, and were not reserved for only devotees of Isis herself. Reflecting his ethnic background, Paêse's adorations were typical of those inscribed by Nubian pilgrims to Egyptian temples, but not of ethnic Egyptians themselves.

Paêse had several children, two of which were Makaltami and Bêk. Makaltami was a third-century strategos and financial manager of temples, who probably had jurisdiction over the entire Dodekaschoinos. He carved a prayer in a temple portico which was reserved for high-ranking priests, suggesting that he also had a senior position in the priestly hierarchy. Makaltami was also the first of the family to hold a Kushite title. Bêk was another "qorene and agent of Isis" who carried out restoration work for the Dakka temple.

Wayekiye (A) was a grandson of Paêse by his daughter Tꜣ- špš and his son-in-law Hornakhtyotef I, and is known from an inscription he made in 227/228. Wayekiye identifies his father as a qorene of Isis, and himself as the prophet of Sopdet, the goddess of the star Sirius, and the priest of "the five living stars [planets]". Later in the same inscription, he calls himself the "chief wizard of the King of Kush". From this description, Wayekiye seems to have been a hierogrammateis, a priestly astronomer in Egyptian religion who was responsible for the calendrical sciences. It is likely that Wayekiye introduced advanced Egyptian calendrical and astronomical knowledge to the kingdom of Kush, for which he received a royal title. Wayekiye and his wife Taêse were later buried in Kushite territory, where the king of Kush may have awarded them with land.

Wayekiye's brother-in-law, Manitawawi, was a prophet, qorene, and agent of Isis who hailed from a family that had long been in service to the goddess. In an inscription, he described himself as the chief of the Triakontaschoinos, prince of Takompso on the border between Roman Egypt and Kush, and as the "agent, scribe, and chief ritualist" of the king of Kush. He married a Kushite noblewoman and had at least two children, including another Wayekiye (called Wayekiye B), who later became a pelmos (district commissioner) of the Kushite king.

Around 250 (possibly 253), Wayekiye (A)'s son Hornakhtyotef II was the high priest of Thoth at Dakka. He left an inscription in both hieroglyphics and Demotic, where he describes himself as "prince of the country of Takompso, chief ritualist of the King of Kush... hont-priest [prophet] of Sothis [Sopdet], General of the Moon, waab-priest of the Five Living Stars [the five planets], who knows the time of the darkening of Sun and Moon." This identifies him as not only a hierogrammateis but as a "ritualist", or a colleague of the Per Ankh, an Egyptian clerical institution compiling ritual and scientific knowledge. This may explain Hornakhtyotef's use of hieroglyphics at a time when the ancient script was rarely used in Egypt. Hornakhtyotef reports that he received royal decrees from the king of Kush, whom he calls "my lord". It appears that by the mid-third century, priests such as Hornakhtyotef, who were ethnically Nubian but part of the largely Egyptian clerical hierarchy of Egypt, served as conduits of Kushite influence into Egypt's southern periphery. Up until the early third century, the Wayekiye dated their inscriptions with the regnal years of Roman emperors, recognizing Roman suzerainty. But Hornakhtyotef uses a Kushite regnal year, possibly that of Teqerideamani II.

Hornakhtyotef's grandson Wygte was also a prophet, qorene, and agent of Isis; he is the last member of the family known to have held priestly titles.

Wayekiye (A) had another son, Qorene, who was also pelmos. He is known from an inscription in which he prays to the gods for a safe journey to Meroë and to make the Kushite king have favor for him. His son Bekemete reached the position of peseto, or viceroy, in the Kushite administration.
