= Adikhalamani =

King of Kush in the 2nd century BCE

Kushite King of Meroë
- Reign: First half of the 2nd century BCE
- Predecessor: Arqamani
- Successor: Tabirqo (?)
Royal titulary
Prenomen
Titenre (step and clean)

M23 X1 L2 X1	ra nw D17 nTr Z3 n stp
Nomen
Adikhalamani ankhdjet Meryiset

G39 N5	i DA X r i mn n anx D&t&N17 st t H8 mr
- Consort: Nahirqo (?)

Adikhalamani was a king of Kush, ruling from Meroë in the first half of the 2nd century BCE.

== Sources and chronology ==
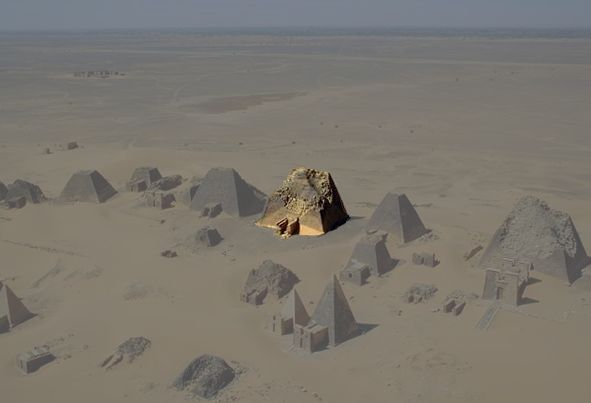
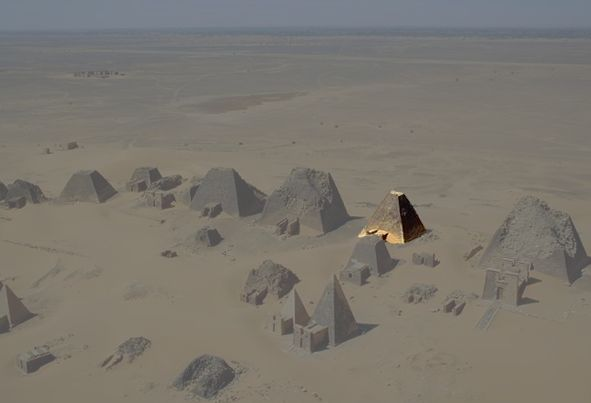
Aerial views of the Nubian pyramids at Meroe in 2001 with highlighting of pyramids N 8 (left) and N 9 (right)

Adikhalamani's name is known only from inscriptions at the temple complex of Philae.

Although no burial for Adikhalamani can be securely identified, he is conventionally attributed either Beg. N 8 or Beg. N 9, both located in Meroë and dating to the approximate time of Adikhalamani's reign. Beg. N 8 preserves the fragmentary name "(...)mr(...)t" and Beg. N 9 preserves the name "Tabirqo". László Török (2015) suggested that Tabirqo was a "funerary name" of Adikhalamani and that (...)mr(...)t was a distinct succeeding king. Josefine Kuckertz (2021) instead proposed that Adikhalamani and (...)mr(...)t were the same king and that Tabirqo was a distinct succeeding king. If Kuckertz's identification is accepted, Adikhalamani was the husband of Nahirqo, whose name is recorded in Beg. N 8 and who later ruled as the first queen regnant of Kush.

Adikhalamani is believed to have been contemporary with an Egyptian revolt dated to ca. 207-186 BCE. During this revolt a ruler, Horwennefer took control of Thebes and revolted against Ptolemy IV Philopator. The revolt ended ca. 186 BCE when Ankhwennefer (his successor or more likely Horwennefer with a different nomen) was captured and executed.

== Titles ==
- Prenomen: Titenre Setepnetjeru ("Image of Re, chosen of the Gods")
- Nomen: Adikhalamani with epithet Meryiset
