= Temple of Maharraqa =

Ancient Egyptian temple

Coordinates: 22°48′2.40″N 32°32′51.35″E

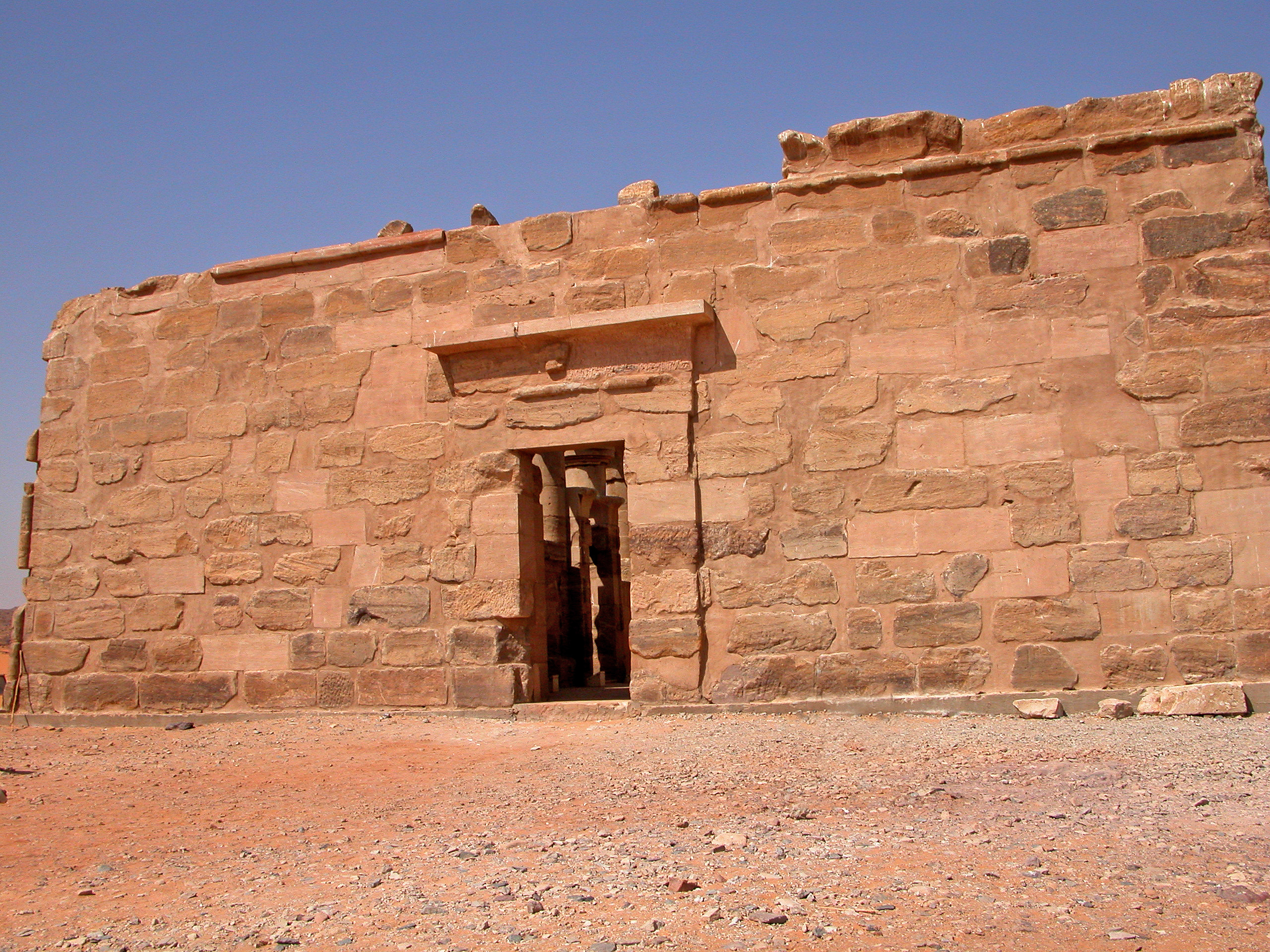
The Temple of Maharraqa in Nubia

Temple of Al-Maharraqa is an ancient Egyptian temple dedicated to Isis and Serapis. It was originally located in al-Maharraqa (Arabic: المحرقة, DMG: Al-Maḥarraqa, Greek: Hierasykaminos), Lower Nubia, approximately 120 km (75 mi) south of Aswan on the southern border of the Roman Empire. It was relocated in the 1960s as part of the International Campaign to Save the Monuments of Nubia.

Only a few years after the Roman conquest of Egypt in 30 BC, the Kushites from the kingdom of Meroë launched a raid on the First Cataract region of Egypt in 23 BC. The Roman prefect of Egypt, Petronius, retaliated and defeated the invading Meroitic army. He then proceeded to station a Roman garrison of 400 troops at the southern outpost of Qasr Ibrim. After some negotiations, a permanent frontier between Meroë and Roman Egypt was established at Maharraqa. Thus, Maharraqa formed the extreme southern frontier of Roman Egypt. After the Christian conversion of Nobatia in the 6th century the temple was turned into a church.

== The Serapis Isis Temple of Maharraqa ==
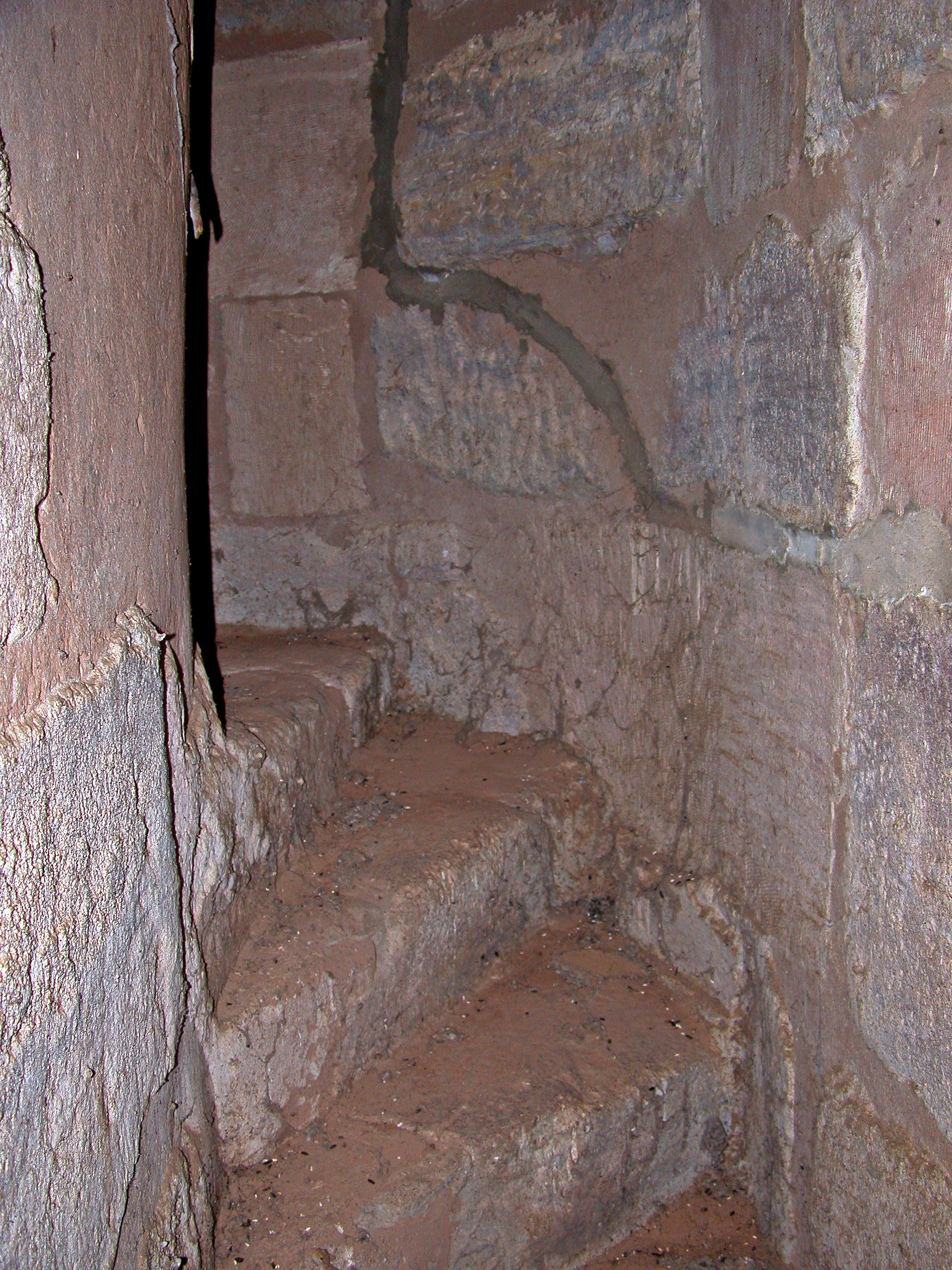
The spiral stairwell of Maharraqa temple

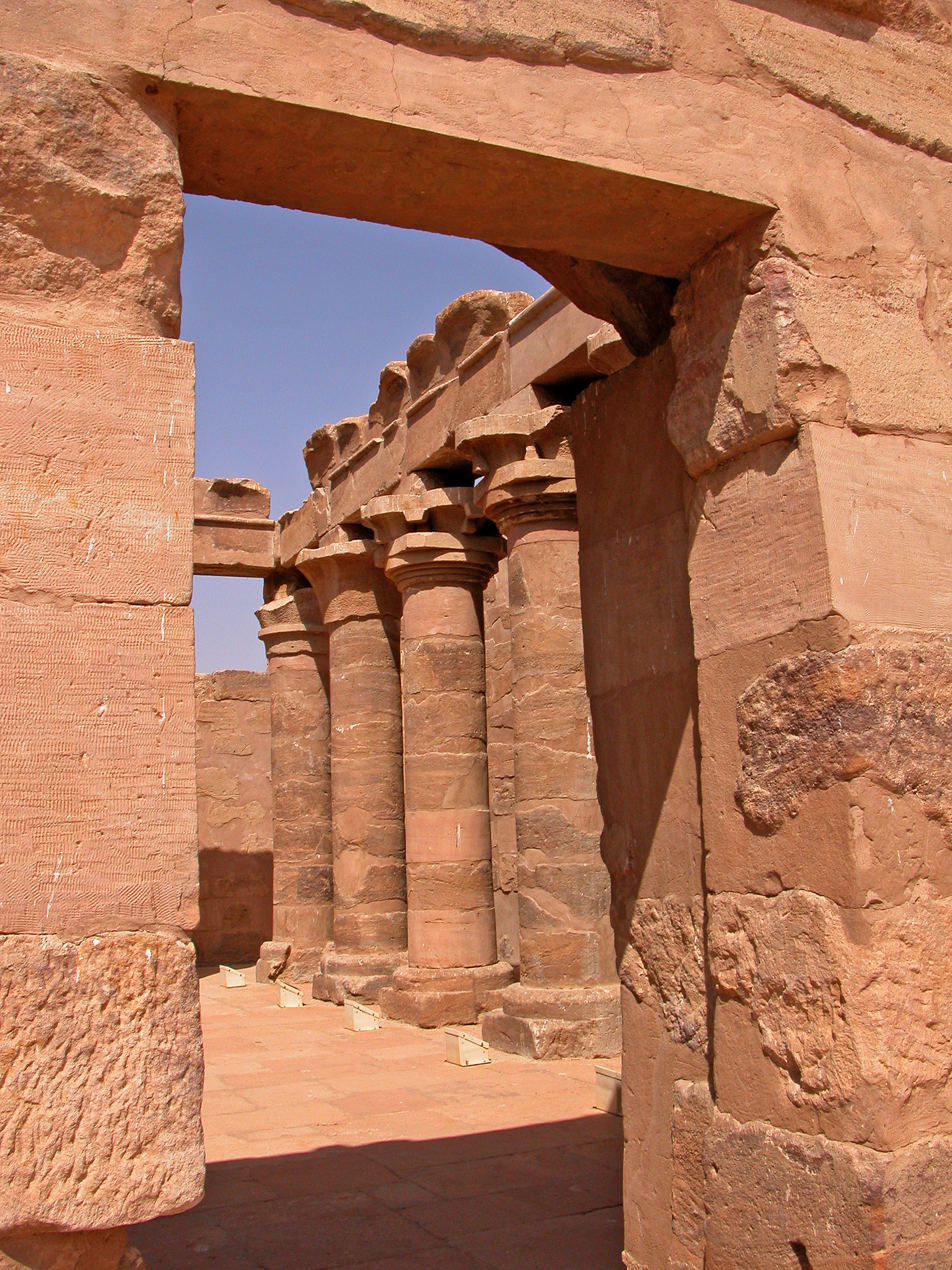
The courtyard of Maharraqa temple

View of the interior of the Temple of Maharraqa.

The Temple of Maharraqa was originally situated here before it was subsequently relocated in the mid-1960s due to the Aswan Dam project. It was dedicated to the ancient Egyptian gods Isis and Serapis. This Roman-built Egyptian temple cannot be securely attributed to any Roman emperor's reign since it was never fully completed nor inscribed. However, since it is known that temple building declined in Nubia after the rule of Augustus, the temple of Maharraqa might be datable to his reign. The only part of the structure that was finished "was a court measuring 13.56 X 15.69 m, which was surrounded on three sides by columns." The actual temple premises containing the sanctuary was never actually built. The temple, as well, lacks a formal pylon.

The Temple of Maharraqa features an architectural curiosity with a winding spiral staircase at a corner of the court, which led to its roof. This is the only Egyptian temple in Nubia with a spiral staircase.

== Church ==
The temple was converted to a church in the 6th century. In the mid-19th century wall paintings of Christian saints were still visible. According to the contemporary traveller Edward William Lane the paintings on the interior of the north wall depicted "the history of the fall of man: the groups representing the different events are arranged in one line, like a procession of men and angels." He also noted many Christian inscriptions.

== Relocation of the Temple ==
Since its former location was threatened by flooding from the Nile due to the construction of the Aswan High Dam, this small temple was dismantled in 1961 by the Egyptian Antiquities Service. In the process, the remaining Christian wall paintings were destroyed. It was subsequently rebuilt along with the Temple of Dakka in 1966 at the New Wadi es-Sebua site which lies only 4 km (2.5 mi) west of the original Wadi es-Sebua location. As Christine Hobson notes:

"A little to the north of Amada now stand the temples of Wadi es Sebua (built by Ramesses II), Dakka and Maharraka."

== See also ==
- List of ancient Egyptian sites, including sites of temples
