= Ankhwennefer (pharaoh) =

Egyptian Pharaoh

- Chaonnophris

Pharaoh in the Great Theban Revolt
- Reign: 201/200–187/186 BC
- Predecessor: Horwennefer
Royal titulary
- Father: Horwennefer?
- Died: c. 186 BC

Ankhwennefer (Ancient Egyptian: ꜥnḫ-wnn-nfr "May Onnophris live"; Ancient Greek: Χαόννωφρις Khaónnōphris), also known as Ankhmakis/Ankhmakhis, Ankhonnophris, or Harmakhis, was the successor of Horwennefer, a rebel ruler who controlled much of Upper Egypt during the reigns of Ptolemies IV and V. His rule lasted from approximately 201/200 to 187/186 BC.

== Reign ==
Ankhwennefer's name alludes to Wn–nfr, the second name of the divine king Osiris on earth. Ankhwennefer succeeded Horwennefer as pharaoh in Upper Egypt between 201 and 199; the exact date remains unclear. His background is also unknown, but he might have been a relative of Horwennefer, and an inscription at Philae hints at Ankhwennefer being Horwennefer's son. Historian Joseph Mélèze-Modrzejewski argued that both Ankwennefer and Horwennefer were probably Nubian. In contrast, Egyptologist Günther Hölbl argued that demotic sources emphasized that the two rebel leaders were native Egyptians, "reveal[ing] how nationally minded the movement was". Either way, both rebel pharaohs stressed their strong connections to Thebes.

In any case, Ankhwennefer encountered a difficult situation at the start of his reign. Horwennefer had died and the rebels lost their capital of Thebes either shortly before or after Ankhwennefer's accession. The Ptolemaic army garrisoned not just Thebes, but even the town of Syene further to the south. According to Egyptologist Toby Wilkinson, Ankhwennefer "daringly" marched his remaining forces into the north, where he plundered and devastated as much as possible to disrupt the Ptolemaic supply lines. The rebel pharaoh was probably aided by the outbreak of new anti-Ptolemaic rebellions in the Nile Delta and the Fifth Syrian War between the Ptolemaic Kingdom and the Seleucid Empire. In 200 BC, much of the Ptolemaic army was destroyed by the Seleucids in the Battle of Panium; this allowed Ankhwennefer to re-strengthen his regime. The rebels' northward offensive succeeded in forcing the Ptolemaic garrison to retreat from Thebes to its southernmost strongholds.

Despite having regained the Thebaid, Ankhwennefer remained beset not just by Ptolemaic loyalists, but also by an invasion by the Kingdom of Kush from the south. The latter were exploiting the chaos in Egypt to expand their realm along the Nile, particularly in the area known as Dodekaschoinos. In 197 or 196 BC, the Ptolemies launched a counter-offensive and retook Lycopolis in the Delta; this city may or may not have been held by rebels loyal to Ankhwennefer. Afterwards, Ptolemy V was officially crowned Pharaoh in Memphis. Deprived of the rich areas in northern Egypt, Ankhwennefer's force was gradually weakened. The Kingdom of Kush also continued its pressure from the south. The Ptolemaic army advanced southward, retaking Sauty province after heavy fighting, and capturing Thebes in 191. Ankhwennefer retreated to the border of Kush, and managed to enlist Nubian troops for his cause. Historian Alan B. Lloyd argued that these Nubians were possibly interested in protecting the Amun temples at Thebes. His last stronghold might have been Syene. The war continued until c. 186 BC, when Ankhwennefer's Egyptian-Nubian army was decisively defeated. Ankhwennefer's son was killed in the fighting, but he was captured.

Ankhwennefer was imprisoned, but might have been spared by Ptolemy V after Egyptian priests intervened on his behalf. Many southern rebels were granted amnesties. In the following months, the Ptolemaic army wiped out the remaining rebels in the Delta.

Overall, little is known about the details of his reign as most of its records were destroyed.

== See also ==
- List of pharaohs
- Great Revolt of Egypt

Preceded by Horwennefer	Anti-ruler of Egypt; 199-185 BC; With: Ptolemy V (as official pharaoh)	Succeeded by -
