= Komanos =

Komanos Κόμανος
- Community
- Location within Greece
- Coordinates: 40°27′36″N 21°46′05″E
- Country: Greece
- Administrative region: Western Macedonia
- Regional unit: Kozani
- Municipality: Eordaia
- Municipal unit: Ptolemaida

Population (2021)
  - Community: 0
- Time zone: UTC+2 (EET)
  - Summer (DST): UTC+3 (EEST)

Komanos (Greek: Κόμανος, Bulgarian: Коман) is a village located southeast of Ptolemaida, in Kozani regional unit, within the Greek region of Macedonia. It is situated at an altitude of 660 meters above sea level. At the 2021 census, it had no permanent population.
