= Horwennefer =

Egyptian pharaoh

Hor-Wennefer

Pharaoh in the Great Theban Revolt
- Reign: 206/205–201/200 BC
- Successor: Ankhwennefer
Royal titulary
- Children: Ankhwennefer?
- Died: before 197 BC

Horwennefer (Ancient Egyptian: ḥr-wnn-nfr "Horus-Onnophris"; Ancient Greek: Άροννώφρις Haronnṓphris), also known as Hurganophor or Haronnophris, was an Egyptian who led Upper Egypt in secession from the rule of Ptolemy IV Philopator in 205 BC. Along with his successor, Ankhwennefer (also known as Chaonnophris or Ankhmakis), they held a large part of Egypt until 186 BC. No monuments are attested to this king, but a graffito dating to about 201 BC on a wall of the mortuary Temple of Seti I at Abydos, in which his name is written Ὑργοναφορ (Hyrgonaphor), is an attestation to the extent of his influence and the ideology of his reign. He appears to have died before 197 BC.

A demotic document by Harpaesis son of Thotortaios is dated to the Year 1 of the king Hor-Wennefer, beloved of Isis, beloved of Amon-rasonther.

Some researchers have interpreted contemporary accounts as suggesting that Horwennefer was a Nubian. In contrast, egyptologist Günther Hölbl argued that demotic sources emphasized that Horwennefer and Ankhwennefer were native Egyptians, "reveal[ing] how nationally minded the movement was". Either way, both rebel pharaohs stressed their strong connections to Thebes.

The Abydene graffito, one of the few documents remaining from his reign, is written in Egyptian using Greek letters, the oldest testimony of a development which would end in the Coptic script replacing the native Egyptian demotic.

== Bibliography ==
- Hölbl, Günther (2000). History of the Ptolemaic Empire. Routledge. ISBN 9780415201452.
- Mélèze-Modrzejewski, Joseph (1997). The Jews of Egypt: From Rameses II to Emperor Hadrian. Princeton University Press. p. 150.

| Preceded by - | Anti-ruler of Egypt; 205-197 BC; With: Ptolemy V (as official Pharaoh) | Succeeded by Ankhwennefer |
