= Timeline of classical antiquity =

Timeline of Classical antiquity see:

- Timeline of ancient Greece
- Timeline of Roman history

== See also ==
- Timeline of Christianity
- Timeline of post-classical history
- History of Mesopotamia
- Timeline of Middle Eastern history
- Timeline of ancient history
