= Timeline of post-classical history =

Timeline of events 5th–15th century CE

The following is a timeline of major events in post-classical history from the 5th to 15th centuries, loosely corresponding to the Old World Middle Ages, intermediate between Late antiquity and the early modern period.

== Overview ==
This timetable gives a basic overview of states, cultures and events which transpired roughly between the years 200 and 1500. Sections are broken by political and geographic location.

=== Elsewhere ===
Dates are approximate range (based upon influence), consult particular article for details
Middle Ages Divisions, Middle Ages Themes Other themes

== Early post-classical history ==
=== 5th and 6th centuries ===
Year	Date	Event	Significance
c. 400		Highland Maya fall to the lowland city of Teotihuacan	Begins the decline of Maya culture and language in some parts of the highlands.
405		St. Jerome finished the Vulgate.	The Christian Gospel is translated into Latin.
410	24 August	Rome is sacked by Alaric I, King of the Visigoths	Decisive event in the decline of the Western Roman Empire.
431	22 June – 31 July	Council of Ephesus	Confirmed the original Nicene Creed, and condemned the teachings of Nestorius, Patriarch of Constantinople, that led to his exile and separation with the Church of the East.
455	2 June	Rome is sacked by Gaiseric, King of the Vandals.	Another decisive event in the Fall of Rome and held by some historians to mark the "end of the Roman Empire".
476	4 September	Odoacer deposes the Roman Emperor Romulus Augustulus	Considered by some historians to be the starting point of the Middle Ages.
480	25 April	Death of Julius Nepos, last Roman Emperor to be recognized as such by the Roman Senate and the Byzantine Empire	Considered by some historians to be the starting point of the Middle Ages.
493	15 March	Theodoric the Great killed Odoacer at a banquet after the Siege of Ravenna (490–493).	The Ostrogothic Kingdom ruled Italy from 493 to 553.
c. 500		Tikal becomes the first great Maya city	Significant cultural exchange between the Maya of Tikal and the citizens of Teotihuacan.
c. 501		Battle of Badon.	The West Saxon advance is halted by Britons in England. Chiefly known today for the supposed involvement of King Arthur but because of the limited number of sources, there is no certainty about the date, location, or details of the fighting.
507	Spring	The Franks under Clovis I defeat the Visigoths in the Battle of Vouillé.	The Visigoths retreated into Spain.
c. 524		Boethius writes his On the Consolation of Philosophy	It has been described as the single most important and influential work in the West on medieval and early Renaissance Christianity.
525		Dionysius Exiguus publishes the Dionysius Exiguus' Easter table.	This initiated the Anno Domini era, used for the Gregorian and Julian calendars.
527	1 August	Justinian I becomes Eastern Roman Emperor.	Justinian is best remembered for his Code of Civil Law (529), and expansion of imperial territory retaking Rome from the Ostrogoths.
529–534		Justinian I publishes the Code of Civil Law.	This compiled centuries of legal writings and imperial pronouncements into three parts of one body of law.
529		Benedict of Nursia founds monastery at Monte Cassino.	The first of twelve monasteries founded by Saint Benedict, beginning the Order of Saint Benedict.
532	1 January	Nika riots in Constantinople.	Nearly half the city being burned or destroyed and tens of thousands of people killed.
533	15 December	Byzantines, under Belisarius, retake North Africa from the Vandals.	Vandal kingdom ends and the Reconquest of North Africa is completed.
535–554		Gothic War in Italy as a part of Justinian's Reconquest.	Byzantines retook Italy but crippled the Byzantine economy and left Italy unable to cope against the oncoming Lombards.
563		Saint Columba founds mission in Iona.	Constructed an abbey which helped convert the Picts to Christianity until it was destroyed and raided by the Vikings in 794.
568		The Kingdom of the Lombards is founded in Italy.	Survived in Italy until the invasion of the Franks in 774 under Charlemagne.
c. 570		Muhammad is born.	Claimed receiving revelations from God, which were recorded in the Quran, the basis of Islamic theology, in which he is regarded as the last of the sent prophets.
577		The West Saxons continue their advance at the Battle of Deorham.	Led to the permanent separation of Cornwall, England from Wales.
581	4 March	Sui dynasty is founded in China.	China unified once again during this period for the first time in almost 400 years.
590	3 September	Gregory the Great becomes Pope.	The missionary work reached new levels during his pontificate, revolutionized the way of worship for the Catholic Church (Gregorian chant), liturgy, etc., and was soon canonized after his death.
597		Augustine arrives in Kent.	Christianization of England (Anglo-Saxons) begins.
598–668		Massive Chinese (Sui and Tang) invasions against Korean Goguryeo.	Contributed to the fall of the Sui dynasty, and Goguryeo fell under the forces of the Tang and Silla.
c. 600		Deliberate fires set for unknown reasons destroy major buildings in Teotihuacan.	Destroys the Teotihuacan civilization and empire. Tikal is now the largest city-state in Mesoamerica.

=== 7th century ===
Year	Date	Event	Significance
602–629		Last great Roman–Persian War.	Long conflict leaves both empires exhausted and unable to cope with the newly united Arab armies under Islam in the 630s
604–609		Grand Canal in China is fully completed	Its main role throughout its history was the transport of grain to the capital.
618	18 June	Tang dynasty is founded in China.	The essential administrative system of this dynasty lasts for almost 300 years.
622	9 September – 23 September	Muhammad migrates from Mecca to Medina.	Event will have designated first year of the Islamic calendar, as Anno Hegirae.
626	June–July	Joint Persian–Avar–Slav Siege of Constantinople	Constantinople saved, Avar power broken, and Persians henceforth on the defensive
627	12 December	Battle of Nineveh.	The Byzantines, under Heraclius, crush the Persians.
632	8 June	Death of Muhammad and accession of Abu Bakr as first Caliph	By this point, all of Arabia is under the religion of Islam. Though the period of Abu Bakr's caliphate was not long, it included successful invasions of the two most powerful empires of the time.
632–668		Establishment and expansion of Old Great Bulgaria.	The demise of Old Great Bulgaria lead to the founding of the First Bulgarian Empire and Volga Bulgaria by the sons of Kubrat.
633–634		Battle of Heavenfield.	Northumbrian army under Oswald defeat Welsh army.
638		Jerusalem captured by the Arab army, mostly Muslims, but with contingents of Syrian Christians.	The Muslim conquest of the city solidified Arab control over Palestine, which would not again be threatened until the First Crusade.
642		Battle of Nahavand. Muslims conquer Persia.	
643		Arab Army led by Amr ibn al-As takes Alexandria.	
645		In Japan, the Soga clan falls.	This initiates a period of imitation of Chinese culture, The Nara period begins many years later.
650		Slav occupation of Balkans complete.	
c. 650		The city-state Xochicalco is founded by the Olmeca–Xicallanca.	Becomes an important cultural and commercial center.
664		Synod of Whitby.	Roman Christianity triumphs over Celtic Christianity in England.
668		End of the Three Kingdoms period in Korea.	Established a Unified Silla which led to the North–South States Period 30 years later.
674–678		First Arab siege of Constantinople.	First-time Islamic armies defeated, forestalling Islamic conquest of Europe.
680	10 October	Slaughter of Husayn ibn Ali, grandson of Muhammad by Umayyad dynasty in Battle of Karbala.	Thus Yazid I secured Umayyad rule form line of Muhammad for more than 60 years.
681		Establishment of the First Bulgarian Empire.	A country with great influence in European history in the Middle Ages.
685		Battle of Dun Nechtain.	Picts defeat Northumbrians, whose dominance ends.
687		Battle of Tertry.	Established Pepin of Herstal as mayor over the entire realms of Neustria and Austrasia, which further dwindled Merovingian power.
698		Arab army takes Carthage.	End of Byzantine rule in North Africa
698		North–South States Period begins in Korea.	Silla and Balhae coexisted in the south and north of the peninsula, respectively, until 926.

=== 8th century ===
Year	Date	Event	Significance
711		Umayyad conquest of Hispania under Tariq ibn Ziyad.	Will begin a period of Muslim rule in the Al-Andalus (with various portions of the Iberian Peninsula) until nearly the end of the 15th century.
718		Second Arab attack on Constantinople, ending in failure.	The combined Byzantine–Bulgarian forces stop the Arab threat in Southeast Europe.
726		Iconoclast movement begun in the Byzantine Empire under Leo III. This was opposed by Pope Gregory II, and an important difference between the Roman and Byzantine churches.	
732	October	Battle of Tours. Charles Martel halts Muslim advance.	Significant moment that led to the forming of the Carolingian Empire for the Franks, and halted the advancement of the Moors in southwestern Europe.
735	26 May	Death of Bede.	Bede was later regarded as "the father of English history".
750	25 January	Beginning of Abbasid Caliphate.	Would become the longest-lasting caliphate, until the 1510s when conquered and annexed into the Ottoman Empire.
751		Pepin the Short founds the Carolingian dynasty.	
754		Pepin promises the Pope central Italy. This is arguably the beginning of the temporal power of the Papacy.	
768	October	Beginning of Charlemagne's reign.	
778	15 August	Battle of Roncevaux Pass.	Caused the death of Roland, and elevated him into legend, becoming the role model for knights and influencing the code of chivalry in the Middle Ages.
786	14 September	Accession of Harun al-Rashid to the Caliphate in Baghdad.	
793		Sack of Lindisfarne. Viking attacks on Britain begin.	Generally considered the beginning of the Viking Age that would span over two centuries, and reach as far south as Spania and as far east as the Byzantine Empire, and present-day Russia.
794		Heian period in Japan.	Considered to be the last classical period of History of Japan. Chinese influence was at its strongest during this era in Japan.
796	29 July	Death of Offa of Mercia.	Marks the end of Mercian dominance in England.
800	25 December	Charlemagne is crowned Holy Roman Emperor though disputed.	With his crowning, Charlemagne's kingdom is officially recognized by the Papacy as the largest in Europe since the fall of the Roman Empire.
c. 800		Gunpowder is invented in the late Tang dynasty (somewhere around 9th century).	One of the "Four Great Inventions" of China.

=== 9th century ===
Year	Date	Event	Significance
814	28 January	Death of Charlemagne.	Would be a factor towards the splitting of his empire almost 30 years later.
820		Birth of Legendary Viking Ragnar Lodbrok	
820		Algebrae et Alumcabola Algorithm	Muhammad ibn Musa- al-Khwarizmi
825		Battle of Ellandun. Egbert defeats Mercians.	Wessex becomes the leading kingdom of England.
827		Muslims invade Sicily.	First encounter of attempts to conquer Byzantine Sicily, until the last Byzantine outpost was conquered in 965.
840		Muslims capture Bari and much of southern Italy.	
843		Division of Charlemagne's Empire between his grandsons with the Treaty of Verdun.	Sets the stage for the founding of the Holy Roman Empire and France as separate states.
843		Kenneth McAlpin becomes king of the Picts and Scots, creating the Kingdom of Alba.	
862		Viking state in Russia founded under Rurik, first at Novgorod, then Kiev.	
864		Christianization of Bulgaria.	The emperor of Bulgaria Boris I was baptized in 864 and was named Michael. Bulgaria fall under the influence of Byzantine Empire.
866		Fujiwara period in Japan.	Would become the most powerful clan during the Heian period in Japan for around three centuries.
865		Death of Ragnar Lodbrok	Viking Great Army rises.
866		Viking Great Army arrives in England.	Northumbria, East Anglia, and Mercia were overwhelmed.
868		Earliest known printed book Diamond Sutra in China with a date.	
871		Alfred the Great assumes the throne, the first king of a united England.	He defended England from Viking invaders, formed new laws and fostered a rebirth of religious and scholarly activities.
c. 872		Harold Fairhair becomes King of Norway.	
874		Iceland is settled by Norsemen.	
882		Kievan Rus' is established.	Would be sustained until the Mongol invasion of Rus' over four and a half centuries, despite peaking during the middle 11th century during the reign of Yaroslav the Wise.
885		Arrival of the disciples of Saints Cyril and Methodius in Bulgaria	Creation of the Cyrillic script; in the following decades the country became the cultural and spiritual centre of the whole Eastern Orthodox part of the Slavic World.
885–886		Vikings attack Paris.	
893		Emperor Simeon I becomes ruler of the First Bulgarian Empire in the Balkans.	Golden age of the First Bulgarian Empire (896–927). The Cyrillic alphabet was developed in the Preslav Literary School and Ohrid Literary School.
896		Arpad and the Magyars are present in Pannonia.	
899	27 October	Death of Alfred the Great.	
c. 900		Lowland Maya cities in the south collapse.	Signifies the end of the Classic Period of Maya history. The Maya in northern Yucatán continue to thrive.

=== 10th century ===
Year	Date	Event	Significance
907		Tang dynasty ends with Emperor Ai deposed.	The Five Dynasties and Ten Kingdoms period in China commences.
910		King Edward the Elder of England, son of King Alfred, defeats the Northumbrian Vikings at the Battle of Tettenhall.	Vikings never raid south of the River Humber again.
910		Cluny Abbey is founded by William I, Count of Auvergne.	Cluny goes on to become the acknowledged leader of Western Monasticism. Cluniac Reforms initiated with the abbey's founding.
911		The Viking Rollo and his tribe settle in what is now Normandy by the terms of the Treaty of Saint-Clair-sur-Epte, founding the Duchy of Normandy.	
913		Sri Kesari Warmadewa reigned in Walidwipa (Bali)	
917		Battle of Anchialus. Simeon I the Great defeats the Byzantines.	Recognition of the Imperial Title of the Bulgarian rulers.
919		Henry the Fowler, Duke of Saxony elected German King. First king of the Ottonian dynasty.	Henry I considered the founder and first king of the medieval German state.
925		The first King of Croatia (rex Croatorum), Tomislav (910–928) of the Trpimirović dynasty was crowned.	Tomislav united Croats of Dalmatia and Pannonia into a single Kingdom, and created a sizeable state.
927		King Aethelstan the Glorious unites the heptarchy of The Anglo-Saxon nations of Wessex, Sussex, Essex, Kent, East Anglia, Mercia and Northumbria founding the Kingdom of England.	
927		According to Theophanes Continuatus (The Continuer of Theophanes's Chronicle) – Tomislav of Croatia defeated Bulgarian army of Tsar Simeon I under Duke Alogobotur, in battle of the Bosnian Highlands.	Bulgarian expansion to the west was stopped.
927		Death of Simeon I the Great. Recognition of the Bulgarian Patriarchate, the first independent National Church in Europe.	
929		Abd-ar-Rahman III of the Umayyad dynasty in al-Andalus (part of the Iberian peninsula) takes the title of Caliph or ruler of the Islamic world.	Beginning of the Caliphate of Córdoba (929–1031).
936		Wang Geon unified Later Three Kingdoms of Korea.	
938		Ngo Quyen won the battle of Bach Dang against the Chinese Southern Han army.	This event marked the independence of Vietnam after 1000 years under the Chinese colony.
955		Battle of Lechfeld. Otto the Great, son of Henry the Fowler, defeats the Magyars.	This is the defining event that prevents the Hungarians from entering Central Europe.
c. 960		Mieszko I becomes duke of Polans.	First historical ruler of Poland and de facto founder of the Polish State.
960		Song dynasty begins after Emperor of Taizu usurps the throne from the Later Zhou, last of the Five Dynasties.	A 319-year period of Song rule (Northern & Southern combined) goes underway.
962		Otto the Great crowned the Holy Roman Emperor.	First to be crowned Holy Roman Emperor in nearly 40 years.
963–964		Otto deposes Pope John XII who is replaced with Pope Leo VIII.	Citizens of Rome promise not to elect another Pope without Imperial approval.
965–967		Mieszko I of Poland and his court embrace Christianity, which becomes the national religion.	
969		John I Tzimiskes and Nikephoros II are executed.	Sultane of Rums are proclaimed.
976		Death of John I Tzimiskes; Basil II (his co-emperor) takes sole power.	Under Basil II zenith of the power of Eastern Empire after Justinian I.
978		Al-Mansur Ibn Abi Aamir becomes de facto ruler of Muslim Al-Andalus.	Peak of power of Moorish Iberia under "Almanzor".
981		Basil II (called "Bulgar Slayer") begins final conquest of Bulgaria.	Complete subjugation of the First Bulgarian Empire.
985		Eric the Red, exiled from Iceland, begins Scandinavian colonization of Greenland.	
987		Succession of Hugh Capet to the French Throne.	Beginning of Capetian Dynasty.
988		Vladimir I of Kiev embraces Christianity, which becomes national religion.	
989		Peace and Truce of God formed.	The first movement of the Catholic Church using spiritual means to limit private war, and the first movement in medieval Europe to control society through non-violent means.

== Middle post-classical history ==
=== 11th century ===
Year	Date	Event	Significance
c. 1001		Leif Erikson is to settle during the winter in present-day Canada at L'Anse aux Meadows.	Ericson is to be the first European to settle in the Americas during the Norse exploration of the Americas.
1016		Canute the Great becomes King of England after the death of Edmund Ironside, with whom he shared the English throne.	Danes become kings of England for the next 26 years before the last rise of the Anglo-Saxons before the Norman Conquest.
1018		The Byzantines under Basil II conquer Bulgaria after a bitter 50-years struggle.	Concludes the Byzantine conquest of Bulgaria.
1021		The Tale of Genji, written by Murasaki Shikibu, is completed sometime before this date.	It is sometimes called the world's first novel, the first modern novel, the first psychological novel or the first novel still to be considered a classic.
1025		The Canon of Medicine is written.	Persian polymath Avicenna set the standard for medical textbooks through 18th century Europe.
1037		The Great Seljuk Empire is founded by Tughril Beg.	Would be a major force during the first two Crusades, and an antagonist to the Byzantine Empire over the next century.
1049		Pope Leo IX ascends to the papal throne.	Leo IX was the pope that excommunicated Patriarch of Constantinople, Michael Cerularius (who also excommunicated Leo), which caused the Great Schism.
1050		The astrolabe, an ancient tool of navigation, is first used in Europe.	Early tool of marine navigators, astrologers, astronomers.
1050		Westminster Abbey is built.	Notable religious building in England and a burial site for English monarchs.
1054		The East-West Schism which divided the church into Western Catholicism and Eastern Orthodoxy.	Tensions will vary between the Catholic and Orthodox churches throughout the Middle Ages.
1066		William the Conqueror, Duke of Normandy, invades England and becomes King after the Battle of Hastings.	End of Anglo-Saxon rule in England and start of Norman lineage.
1071		The Seljuks under Alp Arslan defeat the Byzantine army at Manzikert. The Normans capture Bari, the last Byzantine possession in southern Italy.	Beginning of the end of Byzantine rule in Asia Minor.
1073		Pope Alexander II excommunicates advisors to Holy Roman Emperor Henry IV for simony. Pope Gregory VII elevated to the papal throne following the death of Alexander II.	This begins a period of church reform.
1075		Dictatus Papae in which Pope Gregory VII defines the powers of the pope.	Peak of the Gregorian Reform, and an immense factor in the Investiture Controversy.
1076		Gregory VII excommunicates Henry IV for simony (as Alexander II did with his advisors in 1073).	This is after Henry persuaded most of the German bishops to declare the Pope's election invalid on 24 January 1076, using the Investiture Controversy to his advantage.
1077		Holy Roman Emperor Henry IV walks to Canossa where he stands barefoot in the snow to beg forgiveness of the Pope for his offences, and admitting defeat in the Investiture Controversy.	This helps establish Papal rule over European heads of state for another 450 years.
1077		The Construction of the Tower of London begins.	The tower of London was the ultimate keep of the British Empire.
1086		The compilation of the Domesday Book, a great land and property survey commissioned by William the Conqueror to assess his new possessions.	This is the first such undertaking since Roman times.
1088		University of Bologna is formed.	Currently the oldest university in Europe.
1095		Pope Urban issues the Crusades to capture the Holy Land, and to repel the Seljuk Turks from the Byzantine Empire from Alexios I Komnenos.	This would be the first of 9 Major Crusades, and a number of other crusades that would spread into the late 13th century.
1098		The Cistercian Order is founded.	Was a return to the original observance of the Rule of St. Benedict.
1099		First Crusade. Jerusalem is re-taken from the Muslims on the urging of Pope Urban II.	This would lead to the beginning of the Kingdom of Jerusalem, which would last for nearly two centuries; within the era of the Crusades to the Holy Land.

=== 12th century ===
Year	Date	Event	Significance
1100		Latin-translation of the great masters of Arabic medicine: Rhazes, Ishaq Ibn Imran, Ibn Suleiman, and Ibn al-Jazzar.	Translated by Constantine the African.
1102		Kingdom of Croatia and Kingdom of Hungary formed a personal union of two kingdoms united under the Hungarian king. The act of union was deal with Pacta conventa, by which institutions of separate Croatian statehood were maintained through the Sabor (an assembly of Croatian nobles) and the ban (viceroy). In addition, the Croatian nobles retained their lands and titles.	Medieval Hungary and Croatia were (in terms of public international law) allied by means of personal union until 1526. Although, Hungarian-Croatian state existed until the beginning of the 20th century and the Treaty of Trianon.
1102		Synods of Westminster.	End of simony, clerical marriages, slavery under Anselm of Canterbury
1106	28 September	Henry I of England defeats his older brother Robert Curthose, duke of Normandy, at the Battle of Tinchebrai, and imprisons him in Devizes castle; Edgar Atheling and William Clito are also taken prisoner.	This victory made a later struggle between England and the rising Capetian power in France inevitable.
1107		Through the Compromise of 1107, suggested by Adela, the sister of King Henry, the Investiture Struggle in England is ended.	This compromise removed one of the points of friction between the English monarchy and the Catholic Church.
1109		In the Battle of Naklo, Boleslaus III Wrymouth defeats the Pomeranians.	Polish access to the sea is re-established.
1109	24 August	In the Battle of Hundsfeld, Boleslaus III Wrymouth defeats Emperor Henry V.	German expansion to the centre of Europe is stopped.
1116		The Byzantine army defeats the Turks at Philomelion.	The Turks abandon the entire coastal area of Anatolia and all of western Anatolia
1117		The University of Oxford is founded.	It is the oldest university in the United Kingdom.
1118		The Knights Templar are founded to protect Jerusalem and European pilgrims on their journey to the city.	Becomes the most recognizable, and impactful military orders during the Crusades.
1121	25 December	St. Norbert and 29 companions make their solemn vows marking the beginning of the Premonstratensian Order.	This order played a significant role in evangelizing the Slavs, the Wends, to the east of the Holy Roman Empire.
1122	23 September	The Concordat of Worms was drawn up between Emperor Henry V and Pope Calixtus II.	This concordat ended the investiture struggle, but bitter rivalry between emperor and pope remained.
1123	18 March–27 March	The First Lateran Council followed and confirmed the Concordat of Worms.	
1125		Lothair of Supplinburg, duke of Saxony, is elected Holy Roman Emperor instead of the nearest heir, Frederick of Swabia.	This election marks the beginning of the great struggle between the Guelfs and the Ghibellines.
1125–1127		Jingkang Incident.	The Jurchen soldiers sack Kaifeng, bringing an end to the Northern Song dynasty in China; the Song moves further south and makes Lin'an their new capital.
1130	25 December	Roger II is crowned King of Sicily, a Royal title given him by the Antipope Anacletus II.	This coronation marks the beginning of the Kingdom of Sicily and its Mediterranean empire under the Norman kings, which was able to take on the Holy Roman Empire, the Papacy, and the Byzantine Empire.
1135		The Anarchy begins in England.	This will mark a 19-year period of Government strife and Civil War between the supporters of Stephen and Matilda, and end with the crowning of Matilda's son, Henry II, and beginning the Plantagenet dynasty.
1139	April	The Second Lateran Council declared clerical marriages invalid, regulated clerical dress, and punished attacks on clerics by excommunication.	Enforces the major reforms that Gregory VII began to heavily campaign for several decades earlier.
1140		Decretum	Gratian
1144		Rebuild of Basilica of Saint Denis	Suger
1147–1149		The Second Crusade was in retaliation for the fall of Edessa, one of the first Crusader States founded in the First Crusade. It was an overall failure.	This was the first Crusade to have been led by European kings.
1150		Ramon Berenguer IV, Count of Barcelona, married Queen Petronilla of Aragon. They had been betrothed in 1137.	This marriage gave the Kingdom of Aragon access to the Mediterranean Sea, creating a powerful kingdom which expanded to control many of the Mediterranean lands.
1150		Founding of the University of Paris	
1150		The first known merchant guilds.	
1152		The Synod of Kells-Mellifont established the present diocesan system of Ireland (with later modifications) and recognized the primacy of Armagh.	This synod marks the inclusion of the Irish Church into mainstream European Catholicism.
1154		Common Law	Henry II
1158		The Hanseatic League is founded.	This marks a new period of trade and economic development for northern and central Europe.
1163		The first cornerstone is laid for the construction of Notre Dame de Paris.	One of the most famous Gothic cathedrals of the Middle Ages
1166		Stefan Nemanja united Serbian territories, establishing the Medieval Serbian state.	This marks the rise of Serbia which will dominate the Balkans for the next three hundred years. Allies of Serbia at this moment become the Hungarian Kingdom and the Republic of Venice.
1171		King Henry II of England lands in Ireland to assert his supremacy and the Synod of Cashel acknowledges his sovereignty.	With his landing, Henry begins the English claim to and occupation of Ireland which would last some seven and a half centuries.
1174	12 July	King William I of Scotland, captured in the Battle of Alnwick by the English, accepts the feudal lordship of the English crown and does ceremonial allegiance at York.	This is the beginning of the gradual acquisition of Scotland by the English.
1175		Hōnen Shōnin (Genkū) founds the Jōdo shū (Pure Land) sect of Buddhism.	This event marks the beginning of the Buddhist sectarian movement in Japan.
1175		Arabic/Greek-to-Latin translations of prominent historical books, such as Ptolemy's Almagest, an edited version of the Tables of Toledo, works by Al-Farabi, and others.	Gerard of Cremona
1176	29 May	At the Battle of Legnano, the cavalry of Frederick Barbarossa is defeated by the infantry of the Lombard League.	This is the first major defeat of cavalry by infantry, signaling the new role of the bourgeoisie.
1179	March	The Third Lateran Council introduces twenty-seven canons, of which includes: the limitation of papal electees to the cardinals alone, condemnation of simony, the creation of church-appointed cathedral-schools that would become universities, and prohibition of the promotion of anyone to the episcopate before the age of thirty.	
1183		The final Peace of Constance between Frederick Barbarossa, the pope, and the Lombard towns is signed.	The various articles of the treaty destroyed the unity of the Empire and Germany and Italy underwent separate developments.
1183		The Taira clan are driven out of Kyōto by Minamoto Yoshinaka.	The two-year conflict which follows ends at the Battle of Dan no Ura (1185).
1184	November	Pope Lucius III issues the papal bull Ad Abolendam.	This bull set up the organization of the medieval inquisitions.
1185		Windmills are first recorded.	
1185		Uprising of Asen and Peter. The reestablishment of the Bulgarian Empire.	
1185		At the Battle of Dan no Ura, Minamoto Yoshitsune, cousin of Yoshinaka, annihilates the Taira clan.	The elimination of the Taira leaves the Minamoto the virtual rulers of Japan and marks the beginning of the first period of feudal rule known as the Kamakura Period.
1186	27 January	The future emperor Henry VI marries Constance of Sicily, heiress to the Sicilian throne.	This marriage shifts the focus of the Guelphs/Ghibelline struggle to Sicily and marks the ruin of the House of Hohenstaufen.
1187		Saladin recaptures Jerusalem.	Would lead to the Third Crusade.
1188		Tractatus of Glanvil	Oxford University
1189	6 July	Richard I ascends the throne of England.	His heavy taxation to finance his European ventures created an antipathy of barons and people toward the crown, but his being absent enabled the English to advance in their political development.
1189	11 November	William II of Sicily died and was succeeded by Tancred of Sicily instead of Constance.	A result to the displeasure of Constance and her husband Henry that would lead to expeditions in 1191 and 1194.
1189–1192		The Third Crusade follows upon Saladin's uniting the Muslim world and recapturing Jerusalem.	Despite managing to win several major battles, the Crusaders did not recapture Jerusalem.
1191	May–August	New Emperor Henry VI sets an expedition to conquer Kingdom of Sicily however fails and Empress Constance is captured.	In 1192 Margaritus of Brindisi was created the first Count of Malta for capturing the empress; in the same year Pope Celestine III forced Tancred to release the empress.
1192		Minamoto no Yoritomo is appointed Sei-i Taishōgun, or shōgun for short.	He is the first of a long line of military dictators to bear this title. The institution as a government lasted until 1868, and as a title until 1913 with the death of Tokugawa Yoshinobu, the last Shōgun.
1193		Muhammad bin Bakhtiyar Khilji sack and burn the university at Nalanda.	This is the beginning of the decline of Buddhism in India.
1195		Battle of Alarcos The Almohad Caliphate decisively defeat the Kingdom of Castile.	The Almohads pushed Christians to the north and established themselves as the supreme power in Al-Andalus
1199		Europeans first use compasses.	

=== 13th century ===
Year	Date	Event	Significance
1202		The Fourth Crusade sacked Croatian town of Zadar (Italian: Zara), a rival of Venice. Unable to raise enough funds to pay to their Venetian contractors, the crusaders agreed to sack the city despite letters from Pope Innocent III forbidding such an action and threatening excommunication.	Siege of Zara was the first major Crusade's action and the first attack against a Catholic city by Catholic crusaders.
1202	1 August	Battle of Mirebeau. John of England captures Arthur I of Brittany and Eleanor, Fair Maid of Brittany sister of Arthur.	John secured his English throne with Arthur disappeared in 1203 and Eleanor imprisoned till her death in 1241.
1204		Sack of Constantinople during the Fourth Crusade.	Considered to be the beginning of the decline of the Byzantine Empire.
1205		Battle of Adrianople. The Bulgarians under Emperor Kaloyan defeat Baldwin I.	Beginning of the decline of the Latin Empire.
1206		Genghis Khan was elected as Khagan of the Mongols and the Mongol Empire was established.	The Mongols would conquer much of Eurasia, changing former political borders.
1208		Pope Innocent III calls for the Albigensian Crusade which seeks to destroy a rival form of Christianity practiced by the Cathars.	
1209		The University of Cambridge is founded.	
1209		Founding of the Franciscan Order.	One of the more significant orders in the Roman Catholic church, founded by Saint Francis of Assisi.
1212		Spanish Christians succeed in defeating the Moors in the long Reconquista campaigns, after the Battle of Las Navas de Tolosa.	By 1238, only the small southern Emirate of Granada remained under Muslim control.
1214	27 June	Battle of Bouvines.	King John of England gave up his ambition to recover his continental lands.
1215	15 June	The Magna Carta is sealed by John of England.	This marks one of the first times a medieval ruler is forced to accept limits on his power.
1215		Fourth Lateran Council. Dealt with transubstantiation, papal primacy and conduct of clergy. Proclaimed that Jews and Muslims should wear identification marks to distinguish them from Christians.	
1216		Papal recognition of the Dominican Order.	
1219		Serbian Orthodox Church becomes autocephalous under St. Sava, its first Archbishop.	
1227	18 August	Genghis Khan dies.	His kingdom is divided among his children and grandchildren: Empire of the Great Khan, Chagatai Khanate, Mongolian Homeland, and the Blue Horde and White Horde (which would later become the Golden Horde).
1237–1240		Mongol invasion of Rus' resumes.	Causes the split of Kievan Rus' into three components (present day Russia, Ukraine, Belarus), greatly affects various regions of raided lands in other parts of Europe; Golden Horde formed.
1246		Election of Güyük Khan.	Güyük ruled the Mongol Empire from 1246 to 1248.
1250		Louis IX is captured at the last major battle of the Seventh Crusade.	
1257		Opening of the College of Sorbonne.	
1257		Provisions of Oxford forced upon Henry III of England.	This establishes a new form of government-limited regal authority.
1258	29 January–10 February	Siege of Baghdad	Mongols (the Ilkhanate) ensure control of the region; Generally considered the end of the Islamic Golden Age.
1258		The first Mongol invasion of Vietnam	The Mongol army was defeated by emperor Tran Thai Tong of Đại Việt.
1272–1273		The Ninth Crusade occurs.	Considered to be the Last Major Crusade to take place in the Holy Land.
1273	29 September	Rudolph I of Germany is elected Holy Roman Emperor.	This begins the Habsburg de facto domination of the crown that lasted until is dissolution in 1806.
1274		Thomas Aquinas' work, Summa Theologica is published, after his death.	Is the main staple of theology during the Middle Ages.
1279	19 March	Battle of Yamen.	Marks the end of the Song dynasty in China, and all of China is under the rule of Kublai Khan as the emperor.
1282		Sicilian Vespers. Sicilians massacre Angevins over a six-week period, after a Frenchman, harassed a woman.	Would mark a two-decade period of war, and peace treaties mainly between Aragon, Sicily, and the Angevins.
1283		First legally regulated General Court of Catalonia.	Presided over by king Peter II (III of Aragon) for the whole Principality of Catalonia, it became the first representative assembly of Europe to be officially recognized as a co-legislative body (alongside the monarch).
1285		The second Mongol invasion of Vietnam.	The Mongol army was defeated by emperor Tran Nhan Tong and general Tran Hung Dao.
1287		The third Mongol invasion of Vietnam.	Decisive Vietnam victory. To avoid further conflict, Đại Việt agreed to a tributary relationship with the Yuan dynasty.
1293		Mongol invasion of Java.	Failed invasion of the Javanese Majapahit Kingdom. Which led Majapahit to rise as a significant regional power.
1296		Edward I of England invades Scotland, starting the First War of Scottish Independence.	
1297	11 September	The Battle of Stirling Bridge.	William Wallace emerges as the leader of the Scottish resistance to England.
1298		Marco Polo publishes his tales of China, along with Rustichello da Pisa.	A key step to the bridging of Asia and Europe in trade.
1299	27 July	The Ottoman Empire is founded by Osman I.	Becomes longest lasting Islamic Empire, lasting over 600 years into the 20th century.

== Late post-classical history ==
=== 14th century ===
Year	Date	Event	Significance
1305	Wednesday, 23 August	William Wallace is executed for treason.	
1307	Friday, 13 October	The Knights Templar are rounded up and murdered by Philip the Fair of France, with the backing of the Pope.	Hastens the demise of the order within a decade.
1307		Beginning of the Babylonian Captivity of the Papacy during which the Popes moved to Avignon.	Begins a period of over seven decades of the Papacy outside of Rome that would be one of the major factors of the Western Schism.
1310		Dante publishes his Divine Comedy.	Is one of the most defining works of literature during the Late Middle Ages, and among the most recognizable in all of literature.
1314	23–24 June	Battle of Bannockburn.	Robert the Bruce restores Scotland's de facto independence.
1325		The Mexica found the city of Tenochtitlan.	This would later be the epicenter and capital of the Aztec Empire until the Siege of Tenochtitlan 200 years later.
1328		The First War of Scottish Independence ends in Scottish victory with the Treaty of Edinburgh–Northampton and de jure independence.	
1330	28 July	Battle of Velbazhd.	Balkan shift in power from Bulgarians to Serbians, following the Serbian claim on Macedonia. The Bulgarians lost no land, but they lost their influence outside their territory.
1333		Emperor Go-Daigo returns to the throne from exile, and begins the Kenmu Restoration.	The Kamakura shogunate comes to an end, and the Kenmu Restoration only lasts a few years before the Ashikaga shogunate begins.
1337		The Hundred Years' War begins. England and France struggle for a dominating position in Europe and their region.	The war will span through three/four different war periods within a 116-year period.
1346	26 August	Battle of Crécy.	English forces led by Edward III and Edward, the Black Prince defeat the French forces of Philip VI despite being outnumbered at least 4 to 1, with the longbow being a major factor in favor of England. Also considered to be the beginning of the end of classic chivalry.
1347		The Black Death ravages Europe for the first of many times. An estimated 20% – 40% of the population is thought to have perished within the first year.	The first of many concurrences of this plague, This was believed to have wiped out as many as 50% of Europe's population by its end.
1347		The University of Prague is founded.	It is the oldest Czech and German-Speaking University in the world
1364		Astrarium	Giovanni de Dondi
1368		The fall of the Yuan dynasty. Its remnants, known as Northern Yuan, continued to rule Mongolia.	The breakup of the Mongol Empire, which marked the end of Pax Mongolica.
1370		Tamerlane establishes the Timurid dynasty.	During this 35-year period, Tamerlane would ravage his fellow Islamic states such as the Golden Horde and the Delhi Sultanate in order to accomplish his goal of a restored Mongol Empire.
1371		King Marko's realm is established, the capital is located in Prilep.	
1378		The Western Schism during which three claimant popes were elected simultaneously.	The Avignon Papacy ends.
1380		Prince Dmitry Donskoy of Moscow led a united Russian army to a victory over the Mongols in the Battle of Kulikovo.	The first successful (temporary) attempt to overthrow the Tatar-Mongol yoke over the Russian principalities. Moscow becomes the center of unification of the northeastern Russian lands.
1380		Chaucer begins to write The Canterbury Tales.	Chaucer's greatest work, and one of the foundations towards the formation of the Modern English language
1381		Peasants' Revolt in England	Quickest-spread revolt in English history, and the most popular revolt of the Late Middle Ages.
1381		The Bible is translated into English by John Wycliffe.	First print published in English (Vulgate)
1386	18–19 October	The University of Heidelberg is founded.	It is the oldest university in Germany.
1389	15 June	Battle of Kosovo in Serbia.	This was in many respects the decisive battle between the Turks, led by Sultan Murat, and Christian army, led by the Serbs and their duke Lazar. The battle took place in Kosovo, the southern province of the Medieval Serbian Empire. After this battle Turkish empire continued to spread over the Balkans, to finally reach Vienna.
1392		Joseon dynasty founded in Korea.	Becomes longest reigning Korean dynasty.
1396		The Battle of Nicopolis.	The last great Crusade fails. Bulgaria was conquered by the Ottomans
1397		The Kalmar Union is formed.	Queen Margaret I of Denmark unites the Denmark, Sweden, and Norway, and lasts until 1523.
1399		Richard II abdicates the throne to Henry of Bolingbroke, who becomes Henry IV of England.	End of Plantagenet dynasty, beginning of the Lancaster lineage of kings.

x===15th century===

Year	Date	Event	Significance
c. 1400		Establishment of the Malaccan Sultanate.	The earliest state that was unified on what is now modern Malaysia (except Sabah and Sarawak state).
1402	20 July	Battle of Ankara	Bayezid I is captured by Tamerlane's forces, causing the interregnum of the Ottoman Empire.
1405		Chinese naval expeditions of Southeast Asia and the Indian Ocean (to Eastern Africa) begin, under the leadership of Zheng He.	This will be the first of seven of the Ming dynasty-sponsored expeditions, lasting until 1433.
1409		Ladislaus of Naples sells his "rights" on Dalmatia to the Venetian Republic for 100,000 ducats.	Dalmatia would with some interruptions remain under Venetian rule for nearly four centuries, until 1797.
1410		Battle of Grunwald	Major turning point in history of Lithuania, Poland and the Teutonic Order.
1415		Kingdom of Portugal conquers Ceuta.	Beginning of the Portuguese Empire. Beginning of the Age of Discovery.
1415	25 October	Battle of Agincourt. Henry V and his army defeat a numerically superior French army, partially because of the newly introduced English longbow.	The turning point in the Hundred Years' War for 15th-century England that leads to the signing of the Treaty of Troyes five years later, making Henry V heir to the throne of France.
1418		The Council of Constance ends.	The Western Schism comes to a close, and elects Pope Martin V as the sole pope.
1420		Hussite Wars begin four years after the death of Jan Hus in central Europe at the Council of Constance, dealing with the followers of Jan Hus and those against them.	Although the war was a stalemate (ended around 1434), it was another factor that created violent tension between the Catholics and Protestants before the Protestant Reformation.
1428		Itzcoatl, the fourth Mexica king in Tenochtitlán, allied with Texcoco and Tlacopan, defeats Azcapotzalco.	Signifies the birth of the Aztec Empire and the start of an aggressive expansion lasting 90 years. Itzcoatl and his men began burning historic hieroglyphic books of conquered states, rewriting history with the Mexica at its center.
1429		Joan of Arc lifts the siege of Orléans for the Dauphin of France, enabling him to eventually be crowned at Reims.	The battle at Orléans is the first of many which ultimately drive the English from continental Europe.
1431	30 May	Trial and execution of Joan of Arc.	Death of the woman who helped turn the Hundred Years' War in favor of the French over the past two years.
1434		The Medici family rises to prominence in Florence.	This ushers in a period of significance of the Medicis, such as bankers, popes, queens (regents) and dukes, throughout Europe (mainly Italy, especially the Florentine Republic), over the next three centuries.
1434		Arnolfini Portrait Jan van Eyck	Evidence on usage of convex mirror
1438		Prince Cusi Yupanqui becomes the first Inca emperor.	Inca civilization begins expanding and the Inca Empire is born.
1439		Johannes Gutenberg invents the printing press.	Literature, news, etc. becomes more accessible throughout Europe.
1442		Battle of Szeben	Third significant victory for the Hungarian forces led by Janos Hunyadi over the Ottoman forces.
1443		Sejong the Great creates Hangul	Koreans gain an alphabet suited to their language
1444	10 November	Battle of Varna	Final battle of the Crusade of Varna; Ottomans are victorious over the Hungarian-Polish armies, and Władysław III of Poland dies.
1450		Jack Cade's Rebellion	Unsuccessful popular rebellion in South East England
1452		Coronation of Frederick III	
1453		Constantinople falls to the Ottoman Turks.	End of the Byzantine Empire (or Eastern Roman Empire to some); Constantinople becomes capital of Ottoman Empire.
1453		The Hundred Years' War ends.	England's once vast territory in France is now reduced to only Calais, which they eventually lose control of as well.
1455	22 May	Battle of St. Albans	Traditionally marks the beginning of the War of the Roses.
1456		Siege of Belgrade	Major Ottoman advances are halted for seven decades; last major victory for Hunyadi.
1459		Smederevo falls under the Turks	Marks the end of the Medieval Serbian state.
1461		The Empire of Trebizond falls to the Ottoman Turks.	Last Roman outpost to be conquered by the Ottomans.
1464		Dardanelles gun constructed.	A siege cannon made by the Turkish Munir Ali, modelled after a cannon used in the Fall of Constantinople
1467–1477		Ōnin War takes place in Japan.	First of many significant civil wars between shogunates that would continue for another century during the Muromachi period.
1469	15 April	Guru Nanak is born.	Found Sikhism and becomes the first of the ten Sikh Gurus.
1475		The Khanate of Crimea is conquered and made a vassal state by the Ottoman Empire.	Venice is defeated and the Ottoman Empire becomes master of the Aegean Sea.
1480		Great Stand on the Ugra River.	The end of the Tatar-Mongol yoke over the Russian principalities.
1485		Thomas Malory composes Le Morte d'Arthur	Perhaps the best-known work of Arthurian literature in English.
1485	22 August	Battle of Bosworth Field.	Richard III dies in battle, and Henry Tudor becomes king of England; last shift of Houses/kingship during the War of the Roses.
1487	16 June	Battle of Stoke.	Marks end of the War of the Roses.
1492		Reconquista ends.	Marks end of Moorish-Muslim rule within Iberian Peninsula; Unification of Spain.
1492		Christopher Columbus reaches the New World.	Age of Discovery into the New World begins.
1494	10 June	Spain and Portugal sign the Treaty of Tordesillas and agree to divide the World outside of Europe between themselves.	Pope's ruling will lead to the division of Brazil and Spanish America, as well as the formation of the Spanish Philippines and Portuguese colonies in India and Africa.
1494–1559		The Italian Wars.	Italian Wars will eventually lead to the downfall of the Italian city-states.
1497		Vasco da Gama begins his first voyage from Europe to India and back.	Vasco da Gama sailed round the Cape of Good Hope, established the first direct sea route from Europe to India.
1499		Ottoman fleet defeats Venetians at the Battle of Zonchio.	The first naval battle that used cannons in ships.

== See also ==
- Timeline of ancient history
- Timeline of classical antiquity
- Timeline of Christianity
- Timelines of modern history
