= Philae Island =

Submerged island in Egypt

Coordinates: 24°01′19″N 32°53′20″E

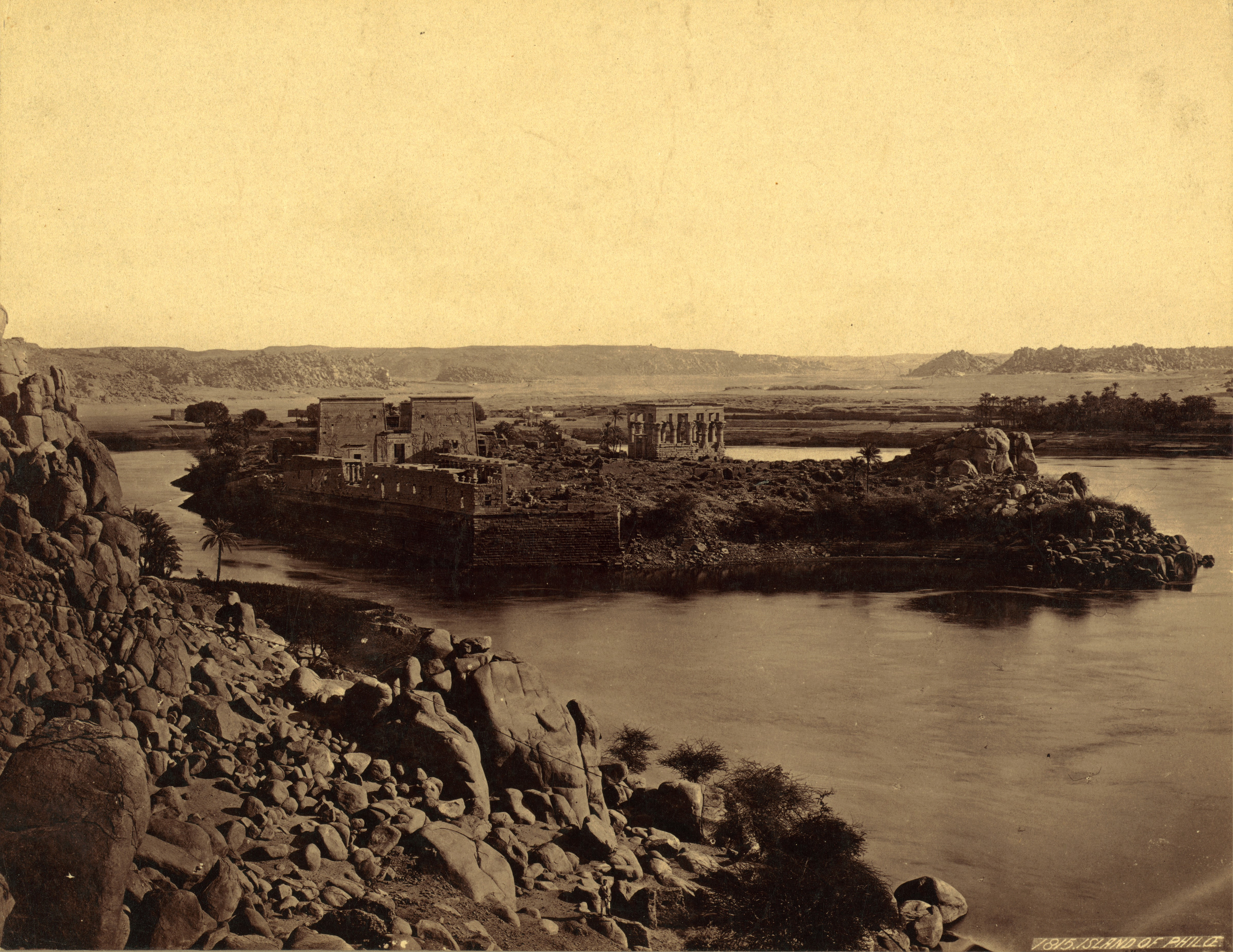
1856 photo of the Island of Philae (now submerged)

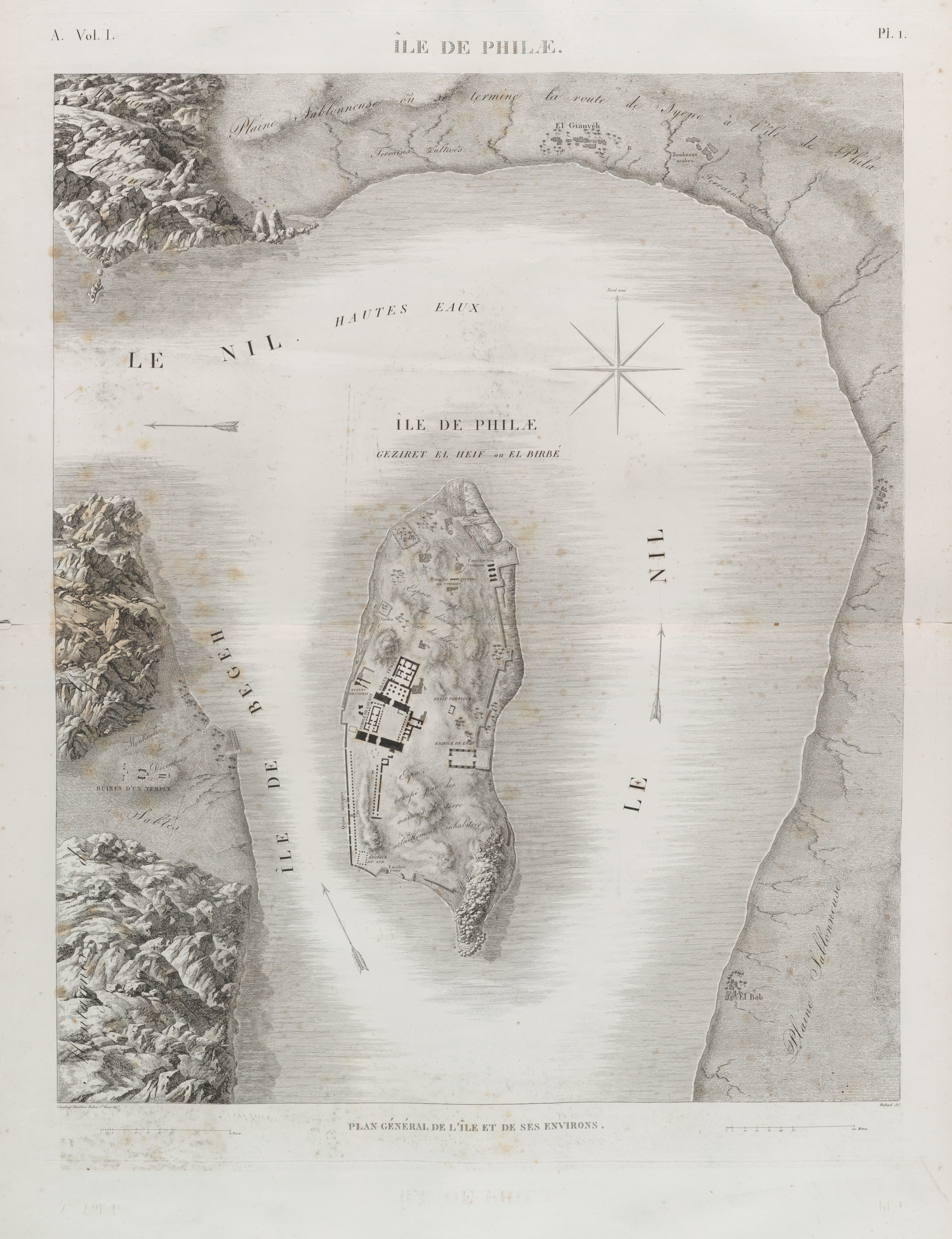
1809 map of the Island of Philae (now submerged), from the Description de l'Égypte

Philae Island was an island near the expansive First Cataract of the Nile in Upper Egypt. Due to the building of the Aswan Low Dam, the island is today submerged. Due to the submerging, the Philae temple complex which had been built on the island, was moved to Agilkia Island.

== History ==
Until 1974, the ruins of temples and an ancient Egyptian city were located here. They were damaged by several decades of seasonal submergence in the lake held back by the old Aswan Dam. With the commissioning of the Aswan High Dam in 1970, there was a threat of permanent flooding of the area. In anticipation of that, between 1974 and 1976 a cofferdam was built around the temples to facilitate their relocation and rebuilding on the neighboring island of Agilkia. After the operation, only the highest point of the ancient island of Philae and the remains of the cofferdam emerge from the lake.

Philae was an ancient Egyptian city within the first nome of Upper Egypt, the nome of the Country of the Arc (or Country of Nubia). It contained the Temple of Isis, one of the best preserved temples in ancient Egypt. This complex was actually one of the last remaining places where the ancient religion survived after the arrival of Christianity in Egypt, officially closing only in 550 AD. With the advent of mass tourism to Egypt, Philae became one of the most popular destinations in the country, attracting several thousand visitors every day during the high season. The hieroglyphic reliefs are being published and analysed by the Philae Temple Text Project (PTTP, Austrian Academy of Sciences, Vienna/University of Leipzig).

== Topography ==
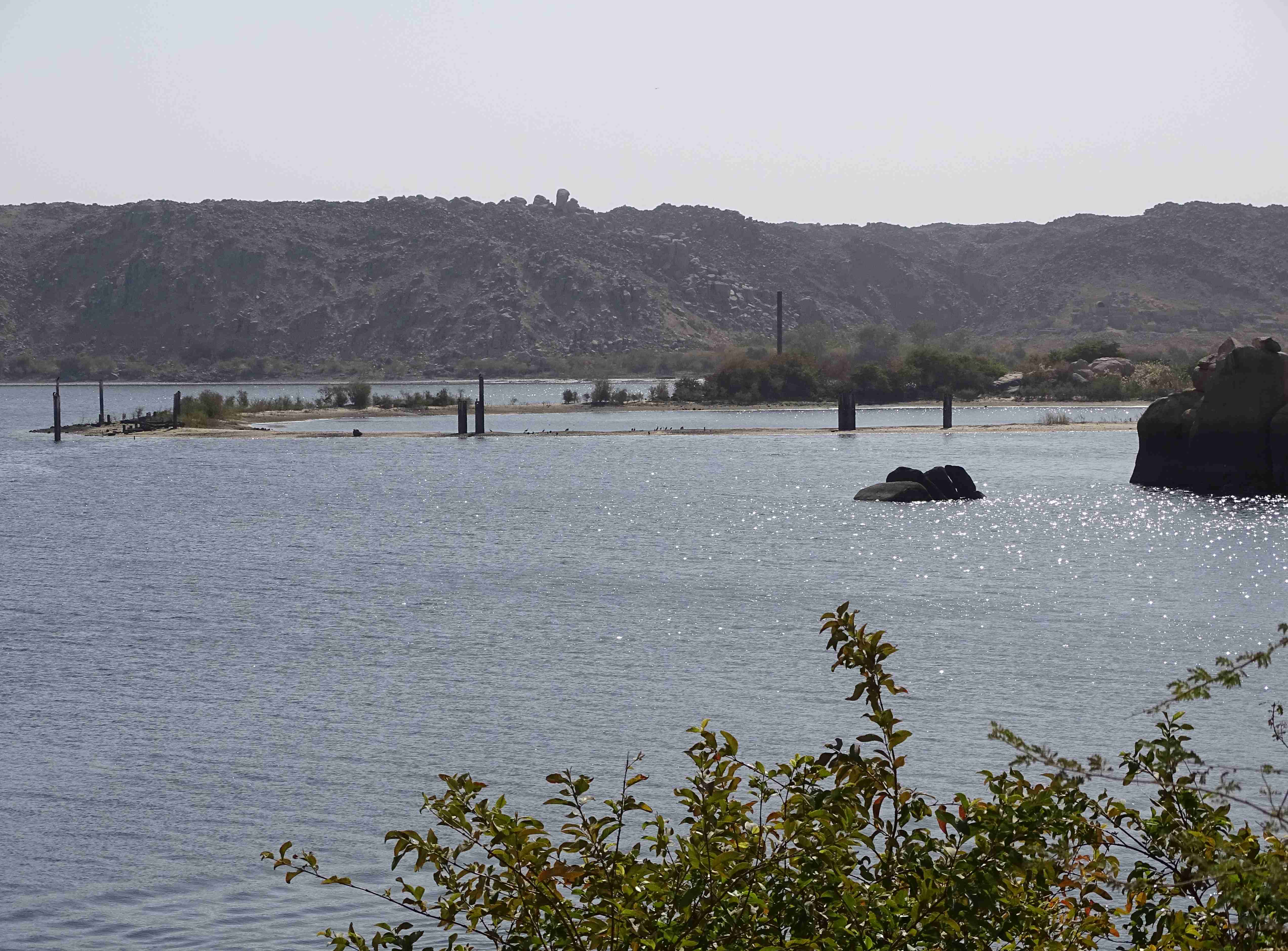
Remains of Philae Island in 2019 (seen from Agilkia Island) - submerged except for highest points and remains of cofferdam

Philae is located south of Aswan, between the ancient Aswan Dam to the northwest and the High Aswan Dam to the south, east of Bigge Island and southeast of Agilkia Island, about three hundred meters distant. Due to the rising water caused by the construction of the two Aswan dams, the island has been fully submerged since the 1970s, except for its highest point, which protrudes as a cliff. Before the flooding, the island was shaped like a bird.
