= Bigeh =

Island and archaeological site

Bigeh Island
Native name: بيجة
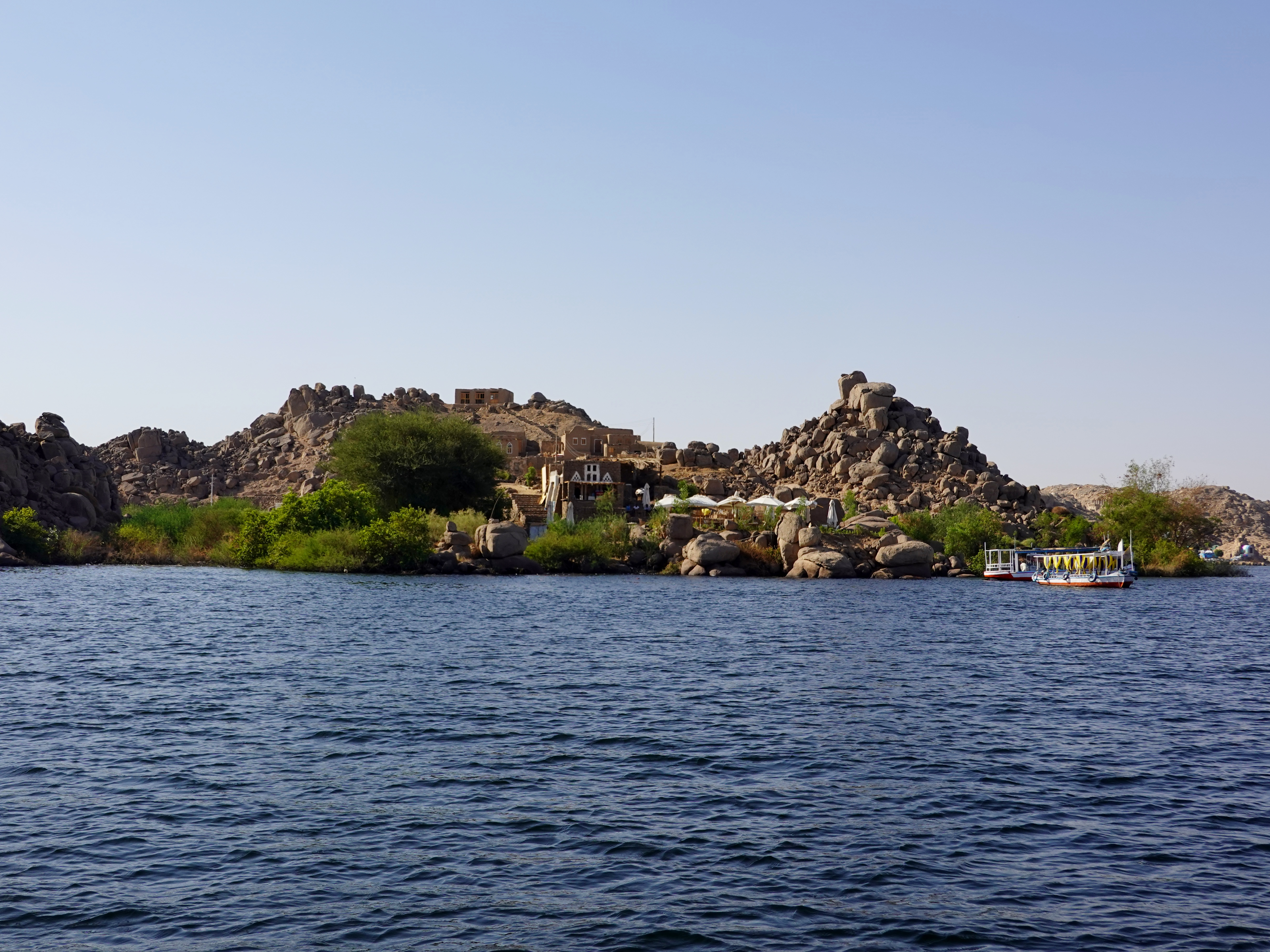

- Location in Egypt

Geography
- Location: Nile River
- Coordinates: 24.021°N 32.885°E
- Adjacent to: Nile

Administration
- Egypt

z n mwt t xAst
snmwt
in hieroglyphs
Era: Middle Kingdom
(2055–1650 BC)

z nw Aa15 t niwt or s nw Aa15 t t xAst
snm(w)t or snm(w)tt
in hieroglyphs

Bigeh (Arabic: بجح; Ancient Egyptian znmwt) is an island and archaeological site situated along the Nile River in historic Nubia and within the Aswan Governorate of southern Egypt. The island has been situated in the reservoir of the Old Aswan Dam since the dam's initial completion in 1902.

== Ancient Egypt ==
It was formerly an island in the First Cataract of the Nile River and its fortification controlled the access to ancient Upper Egypt and Nubia. It is a World Heritage Site, located close to Philae and Agilkia Islands and their ancient archaeological sites in the reservoir.

Bigeh Island was sacred to the ancient Egyptians. They believed that Osiris was buried on the island and a temple that stood on it was known as Abaton, Greek for "untrodden place", because only priests were allowed to set foot there. The temple was mentioned by both Seneca and Lucan.

The god Thoth bore the epithets of "Great and Splendid God in Bigeh" and "He that Pacifies the Nsr.t in Bigeh". It is thought that there may have been a temple of Thoth on the island.

In the mid or late 3rd century AD, an embassy from King Talakhidamani of Kush visited the Abaton with gifts.

== Gallery ==
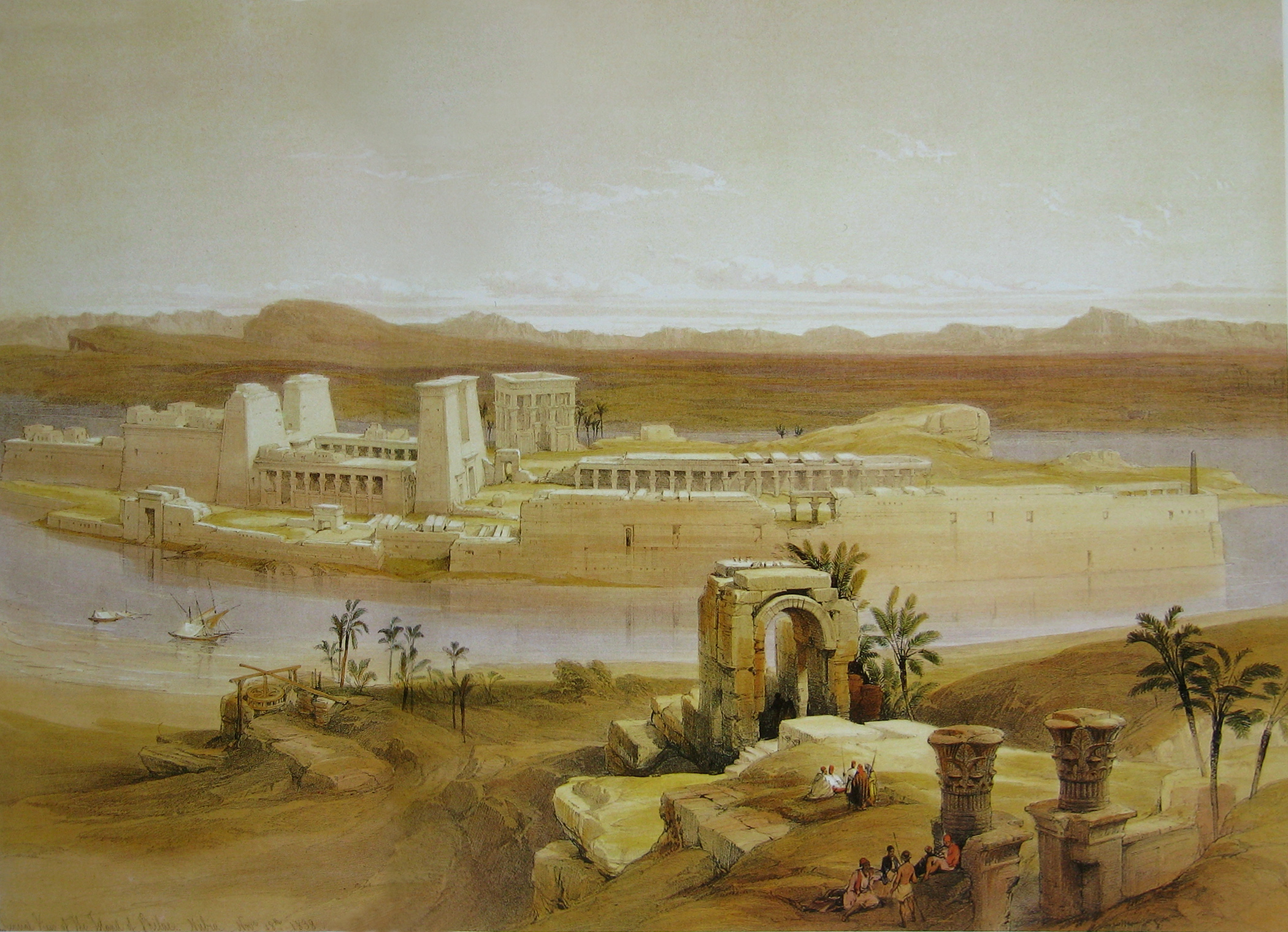
Bigeh (foreground) and Philae with temple,
in the First Cataract of the Nile River.
(1838 painting by David Roberts).

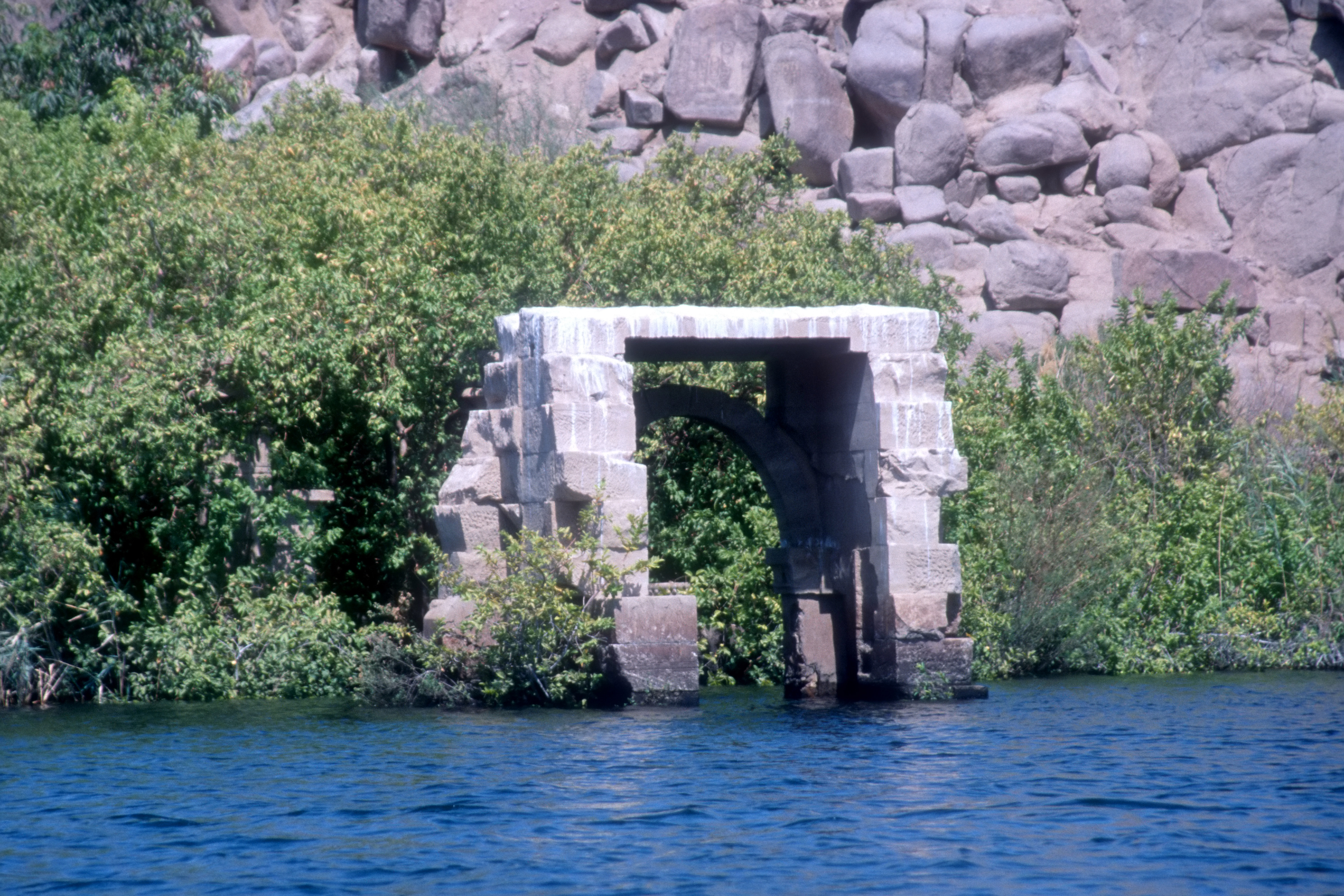
Bigeh island ruins in 2006 in the Old Aswan Dam reservoir.
