= Diocese of Philae =

Ancient Christian diocese in Egypt

The ancient Diocese of Philae was a Christian see in Philae, Egypt.

== List of Bishops ==
- Makedonios, c. 346
- Mark, c. 350s, banished to the Siwa Oasis by the Arian archbishop George of Cappadocia
- Isaiah, c. 368
- Psoulousia, c. 385
- Unknown?
- Danielios, c. 450
- Unknown?
- Theodoros, c. 520 – after 577 (established church within the Temple of Isis)
- Unknown?
- Pousi
