= Philae temple complex =

7th or 6th-century BC temple in Egypt

Philae Temple Complex
- Φιλαί (Ancient Greek); فيلة (Arabic); ⲡⲓⲗⲁⲕ (Coptic)
- The temple of Isis from Philae at its current location on Agilkia Island in the reservoir of the Aswan Low Dam

- Location within Egypt
- 24°1′15″N 32°53′22″E
- Type: Sanctuary
- Periods: Third Intermediate Period or Late Period to Byzantine Empire
- Location: Aswan, Aswan Governorate, Egypt
- Region: Nubia

History
- Built: 7th or 6th century BC
- Built by: Taharqa or Psamtik II
- Abandoned: 6th century AD

UNESCO World Heritage Site
- Official name: Nubian Monuments from Abu Simbel to Philae
- Type: Cultural
- Criteria: i, iii, vi
- Designated: 1979 (3rd session)
- Reference no.: 88
- Region: Arab States

The Philae temple complex (/ˈfaɪliː/; Ancient Greek: Φιλαί or Φιλή and Πιλάχ, Arabic: فيلة Egyptian Arabic: [fiːlæ], Egyptian: p3-jw-rķ' or 'pA-jw-rq; Coptic: ⲡⲓⲗⲁⲕ, ⲡⲓⲗⲁⲕϩ, Coptic pronunciation: [ˈpilɑk, ˈpilɑkh]) is an island-based temple complex in the reservoir of the Aswan Low Dam, downstream of the Aswan Dam and Lake Nasser, Egypt in Africa.

Originally, the temple complex was located on Philae Island, near the expansive First Cataract of the Nile in Upper Egypt. These rapids and the surrounding area have been variously flooded since the initial construction of the Aswan Low Dam in 1902. With the construction of the modern dam in Aswan (1960–1970) a few kilometers upstream, this temple was going to face total flooding and was initially omitted from the International Campaign to Save the Monuments of Nubia project to rescue all temples in the area and avoid what had previously happened with the Aswan Low Dam and the Temple of Philae. However, the importance of the monumental complex, formerly known as the Pearl of the Nile, remembered for the description by Pierre Loti in his literary work, La Mort de Philae (1909), led to further commitment from UNESCO member countries, which launched an international competition to save the monuments of Philae.

The solution proposed by a consortium of Egyptian designers prevailed, which involved dismantling the ninety-five monumental structures on the island and reconstructing them at a higher site, 12.40 meters above the original location, by leveling the nearby islet of Agilkia. The contract for the execution of the works was awarded by UNESCO in 1974, through the Egyptian Ministry of Culture, to two Italian companies: Condotte Acque from Rome and Mazzi Estero from Verona, later joined as Condotte-Mazzi Estero S.p.A. The two companies were tasked with documenting, dismantling, and restoring the Philae monumental complex, as well as transferring and reconstructing it at the new site on Agilkia Island. A third Egyptian company, the High Dam Company, which had previously built the Aswan High Dam, was assigned the task of draining the original monumental site and preparing the reinforced concrete foundations and landscaping of Agilkia. The Italian architect Giovanni Joppolo was entrusted with the supervision and responsibility for all operations under the Italian consortium's jurisdiction. The whole operation lasted from 1977 to 1980. The hieroglyphic reliefs of the temple complex are being studied and published by the Philae Temple Text Project of the Austrian Academy of Sciences, Vienna (Institute OREA).

== Geography ==
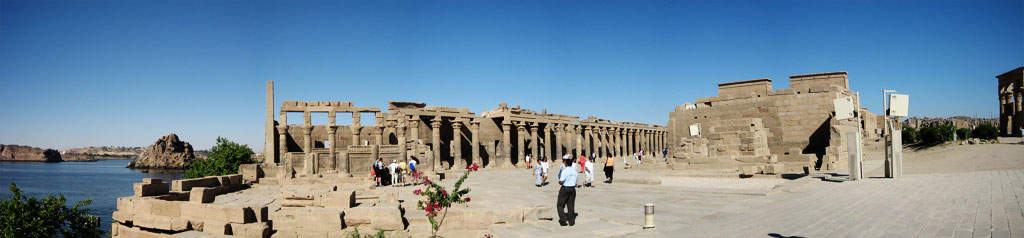
Panoramic view of the Philae Temple from south, at its current location on Agilkia Island

pA iAt r k t niwt or p y iAt r q niwt
pꜣ jꜣ rk(ḳ)
in hieroglyphs

Philae is mentioned by numerous ancient writers, including Strabo, Diodorus Siculus, Ptolemy, Seneca, and Pliny the Elder. It was, as the plural name indicates, the appellation of two small islands situated in latitude 24° north, just above the First Cataract near Aswan (Egyptian Swenet "Trade"; Ancient Greek: Συήνη). Groskurd computes the distance between these islands and Aswan at about 100 km (62 mi).

Despite being the smaller island, Philae proper was, from the numerous and picturesque ruins formerly there, the more interesting of the two. Before the inundation, it was not more than 380 metres (1,250 ft) long and about 120 metres (390 ft) broad. It is composed of syenite: its sides are steep and on their summits a lofty wall was built encompassing the isle. It was reported too that neither birds flew over it nor fish approached its shores. However, since the time of the Ptolemaic Kingdom, Philae was a popular site to visit, partly by pilgrims to the tomb of Osiris, partly by persons on secular errands; so much so that the priests petitioned Ptolemy VIII Physcon (170–117 BC) to prohibit public functionaries from coming there and living at their expense.

In the nineteenth century, William John Bankes took the Philae obelisk on which this petition was engraved to England. When its Egyptian hieroglyphs were compared with those of the Rosetta Stone, it threw great light upon the Egyptian consonantal alphabet.

The islands of Philae were not, however, merely sacerdotal abodes; they were also the centres of commerce between Meroë and Memphis. The rapids of the cataracts were at most seasons not navigable, and the commodities exchanged between Egypt and Nubia were reciprocally landed and re-embarked at Syene and Philae.

The neighbouring granite quarries also attracted a numerous population of miners and stonemasons. For the convenience of this traffic, a gallery or road was formed in the rocks along the east bank of the Nile, portions of which are still extant.

Philae also was remarkable for the singular effects of light and shade resulting from its position near the Tropic of Cancer. As the sun approached its northern limit the shadows from the projecting cornices and moldings of the temples sink lower and lower down the plain surfaces of the walls, until, the sun having reached its highest altitude, the vertical walls are overspread with dark shadows, forming a striking contrast with the fierce light which illuminates all surrounding objects.

== Construction ==
The most conspicuous feature of both islands was their architectural wealth. Monuments of various eras, extending from the Pharaohs to the Caesars, occupy nearly their whole area. The principal structures, however, lay at the south end of the smaller island.

The most ancient was a temple for Isis, built in the reign of Nectanebo I during 380–362 BC, which was approached from the river through a double colonnade. Nekhtnebef was his ancient Egyptian royal titulary and he became the founding pharaoh of the Thirtieth and last native dynasty when he deposed and killed Nepherites II.

For the most part, the other ruins date from the Ptolemaic Kingdom, more especially with the reigns of Ptolemy II Philadelphus, Ptolemy V Epiphanes, and Ptolemy VI Philometor (282–145 BC), with many traces of Roman work in Philae dedicated to Ammon-Osiris.

In front of the propyla were two colossal lions in granite, behind which stood a pair of obelisks, each 13 metres (43 ft) high. The propyla were pyramidal in form and colossal in dimensions. One stood between the dromos and pronaos, another between the pronaos and the portico, while a smaller one led into the sekos or adyton. At each corner of the adytum stood a monolithic shrine, the cage of a sacred hawk. Of these shrines one is now in the Louvre, the other in the Museum at Florence.

Beyond the entrance into the principal court are small temples, one of which, dedicated to Isis, Hathor, and a wide range of deities related to midwifery, is covered with sculptures representing the birth of Ptolemy Philometor, under the figure of the god Horus. The story of Osiris is everywhere represented on the walls of this temple, and two of its inner chambers are particularly rich in symbolic imagery. Upon the two great propyla are Greek inscriptions intersected and partially destroyed by Egyptian figures cut across them.

The monuments in both islands indeed attested, beyond any others in the Nile valley, the survival of pure Egyptian art centuries after the last of the Pharaohs had ceased to reign. Great pains have been taken to mutilate the sculptures of this temple. The work of deletion is attributable, in the first instance, to the zeal of the early Christians, and afterwards, to the policy of the Iconoclasts, who curried favour for themselves with the Byzantine court by the destruction of heathen images as well as Christian ones. Images/icons of Horus are often less mutilated than the other carvings. In some wall scenes, every figure and hieroglyphic text except that of Horus and his winged solar-disk representation has been meticulously scratched out by early Christians. This is presumably because the early Christians had some degree of respect for Horus or the legend of Horus - it may be because they saw parallels between the stories of Jesus and Horus (see Jesus in comparative mythology#Iconography and #Dying-and-rising god archetype).

The soil of Philae had been prepared carefully for the reception of its buildings–being leveled where it was uneven, and supported by masonry where it was crumbling or insecure. For example, the western wall of the Great Temple, and the corresponding wall of the dromos, were supported by very strong foundations, built below the pre-inundation level of the water, and rested on the granite which in this region forms the bed of the Nile. Here and there steps were hewn out from the wall to facilitate the communication between the temple and the river.

At the southern extremity of the dromos of the Great Temple was a smaller temple, apparently dedicated to Hathor; at least the few columns that remained of it are surmounted with the head of that goddess. Its portico consisted of twelve columns, four in front and three deep. Their capitals represented various forms and combinations of the palm branch, the doum palm branch, and the lotus flower. These, as well as the sculptures on the columns, the ceilings, and the walls were painted with the most vivid colors, which, owing to the dryness of the climate, have lost little of their original brilliance.

== History ==
=== Pharaonic era ===
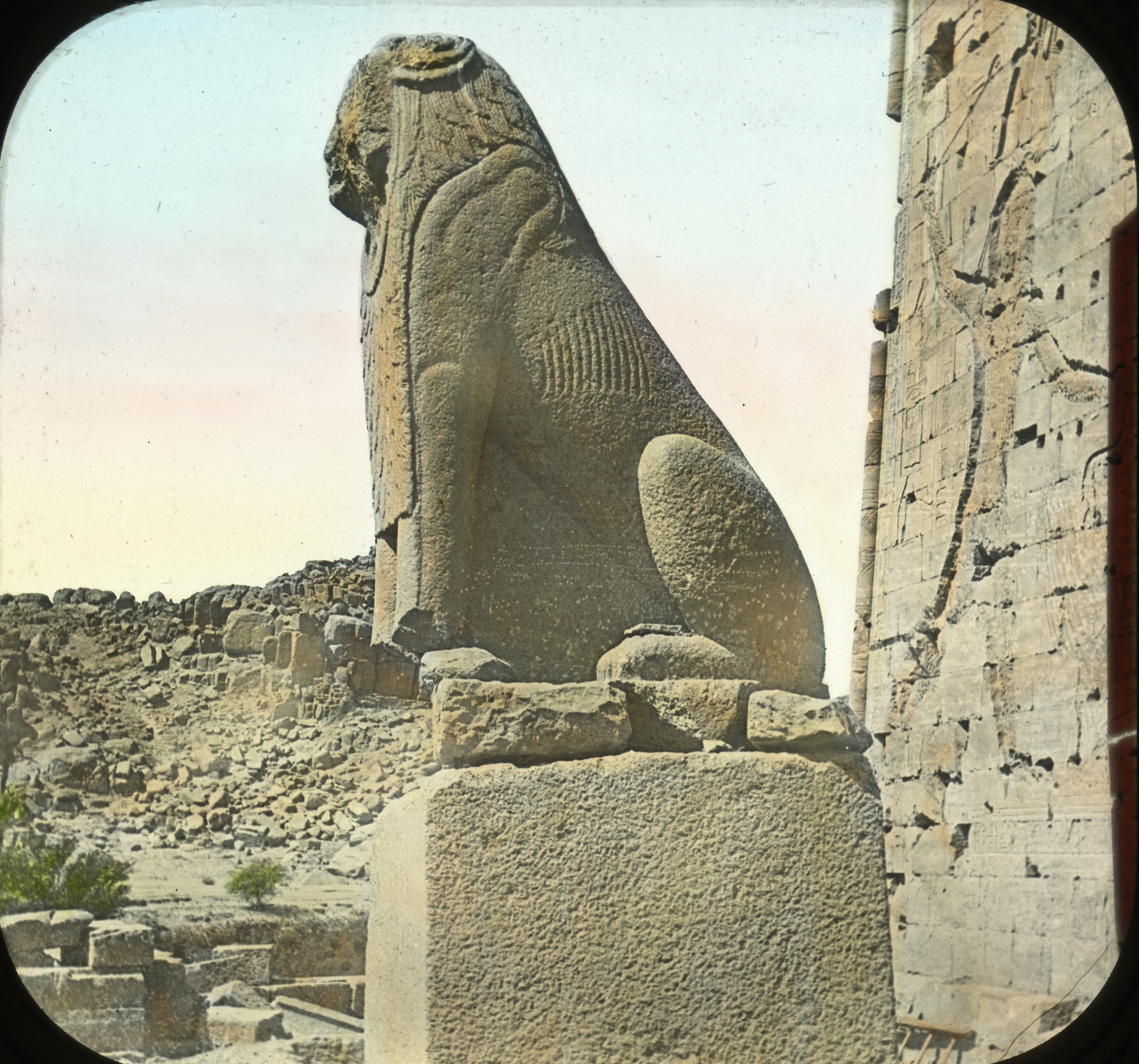
A sphinx in Philae

The ancient Egyptian name of the smaller island meant "boundary". As their southern frontier, the pharaohs of Egypt kept there a strong garrison, and it was also a barracks for Greek and Roman soldiers in their turn.

The first religious building on Philae was likely a shrine built by Pharaoh Taharqa of the 25th Dynasty, which was probably dedicated to Amun. However this structure is only known from a few blocks reused in later buildings, which Gerhard Haeny suspects may have been brought over for reuse from structures elsewhere.

The oldest temple to have undoubtedly stood on the island, as well as the first evidence of Isis-worship there, was a small kiosk built by Psamtik II of the 26th Dynasty. This was followed by contributions from Amasis II (26th Dynasty) and Nectanebo I (30th Dynasty). Of these early buildings, only two elements built by Nectanebo I survive– a kiosk that was originally the vestibule of the old Isis temple, and a gateway which was later incorporated into the first pylon of the current temple.

=== Ptolemaic era ===
More than two thirds of Philae's surviving structures were built in the Ptolemaic era, during which the island became a prominent site of pilgrimage not only for Egyptians and Nubians but for pilgrims from as far as Anatolia, Crete, and the Greek mainland. In this way, Philae gradually overtook Elephantine as the most important sanctuary in southern Egypt. Some of these pilgrims marked their presence with inscriptions on the temple walls, including votive inscriptions known as proskynemata, as well as other types. Among these are inscriptions left by three Romans (maybe ambassadors) at the first pylon in the summer of 116 BC, which represent the oldest known Latin inscriptions in Egypt.

Along with the various contributions of Ptolemaic rulers, Philae also received additions from the Nubian king Arqamani, who contributed to the Temple of Arensnuphis and the mammisi, and his successor Adikhalamani, whose name has been found on a stela on the island. Some experts have interpreted these additions as signs of collaboration between the Nubian and Ptolemaic governments, but others consider them to represent a period of Nubian occupation of the region, likely enabled by the revolt of Hugronaphor in Upper Egypt. The cartouches of Arqamani were later erased by Ptolemy V, while the stela of Adikhalamani was eventually reused as filling under the floor of the pronaos.

=== Roman era ===
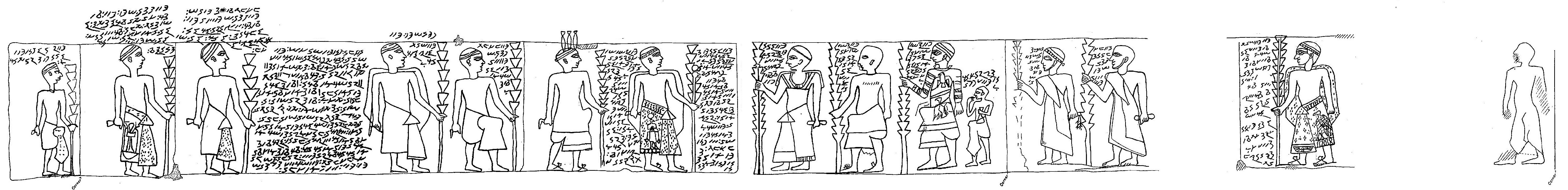
A relief from the so-called "Meroitic chamber" at Philae, showing in two processions a Kushite diplomatic mission sent by King Talakhidamani, perhaps around 260 or later, around 300

The Roman era saw an overall decline in pilgrimage to Philae, especially from Mediterranean regions, as evidenced by the reduced number of inscriptions. Nevertheless, it remained an important sacred site, especially for Nubians, who continued to visit both as individual pilgrims and in official delegations from their government in Meroë.

Several Roman emperors made artistic and architectural contributions to Philae. While most of the architectural additions date to the Julio-Claudian dynasty, the island continued to receive contributions to its temples up to the time of Caracalla as well as a triple arch built by Diocletian. In AD 298, Diocletian ceded Roman territory south of the First Cataract as part of an agreement made with the neighboring Nobades, withdrawing the border to about the area of Philae itself. The Kushite king Yesebokheamani made a pilgrimage to Philae in this period and may have taken over the Roman hegemony.

During the Roman era, Philae was the site of the last known inscription in Egyptian hieroglyphs, written in AD 394, and the last known Demotic inscription, written in 452.

==== Christianization ====
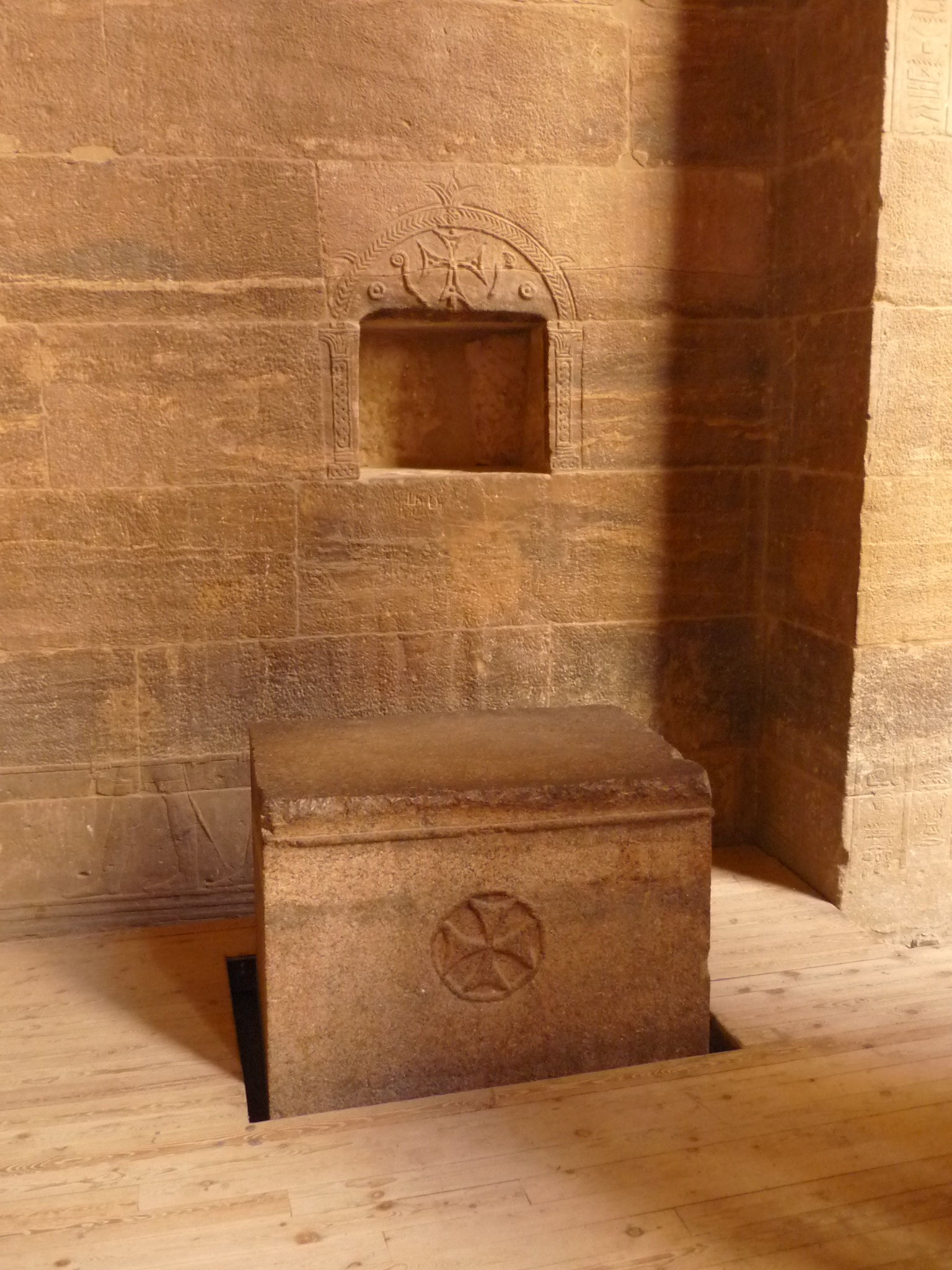
Christian altar in the first hypostyle hall at Philae temple complex

Christianity seems to have been present at Philae by the fourth century, at which point it coexisted with traditional Egyptian religion. According to the Coptic hagiography Life of Aaron, the first bishop of Philae was Macedonius (attested in the early fourth century), who is said to have killed the sacred falcon kept on the island, though modern experts question the historicity of this account. By the mid fifth century, a petition from Bishop Appion of Syene to co-emperors Theodosius II and Valentinian III indicates the presence of multiple churches on the island functioning alongside the pagan temples.

Traditional worship at Philae appears to have survived into at least the fifth century, despite the anti-pagan discrimination at times. In fact, the fifth-century historian Priscus mentions a treaty between the Roman commander Maximinus and the Blemmyes and Nobades in 452, which amongst other things ensured access to the cult image of Isis.

According to the sixth-century historian Procopius, the temple was closed down officially in AD 537 by the local commander Narses the Persarmenian in accordance with an order of Byzantine emperor Justinian I. This event is conventionally considered to mark the end of ancient Egyptian religion. However, its importance has recently come into question, following a major study by Jitse Dijkstra who argues that organised paganism at Philae ended in the fifth century, based on the fact that the last inscriptional evidence of an active pagan priesthood there dates to the 450s. Nevertheless, some adherence to traditional religion seems to have survived into the sixth century, based on a petition from Dioscorus of Aphrodito to the governor of the Thebaid dated to 567. The letter warns of an unnamed man (the text calls him "eater of raw meat") who, in addition to plundering houses and stealing tax revenue, is alleged to have restored paganism at "the sanctuaries", possibly referring to the temples at Philae.

Philae retained significance as a Christian centre even after its closure as a pagan site. Five of its temples were converted into churches (including the Temple of Isis, which was dedicated to Saint Stephen), and two purpose-built churches were constructed on the north side of the island.

=== 1800s ===
The island of Philae attracted much attention in the 19th century. In the 1820s, Joseph Bonomi the Younger, a British Egyptologist and museum curator visited the island. So did Amelia Edwards, a British novelist in 1873–1874.

The approach by water is quite the most beautiful. Seen from the level of a small boat, the island, with its palms, its colonnades, its pylons, seems to rise out of the river like a mirage. Piled rocks frame it on either side, and the purple mountains close up the distance. As the boat glides nearer between glistening boulders, those sculptured towers rise higher and even higher against the sky. They show no sign of ruin or age. All looks solid, stately, perfect. One forgets for the moment that anything is changed. If a sound of antique chanting were to be borne along the quiet air–if a procession of white-robed priests bearing aloft the veiled ark of the God, were to come sweeping round between the palms and pylons–we should not think it strange.

— Amelia B. Edwards, A thousand miles up the Nile / by Amelia B. Edwards, 1831–1892, p. 207.

These visits are only a small sample of the great interest that Victorian-era Britain had for Egypt. Soon, tourism to Philae became common.

=== 1900s ===
==== Aswan Low Dam ====
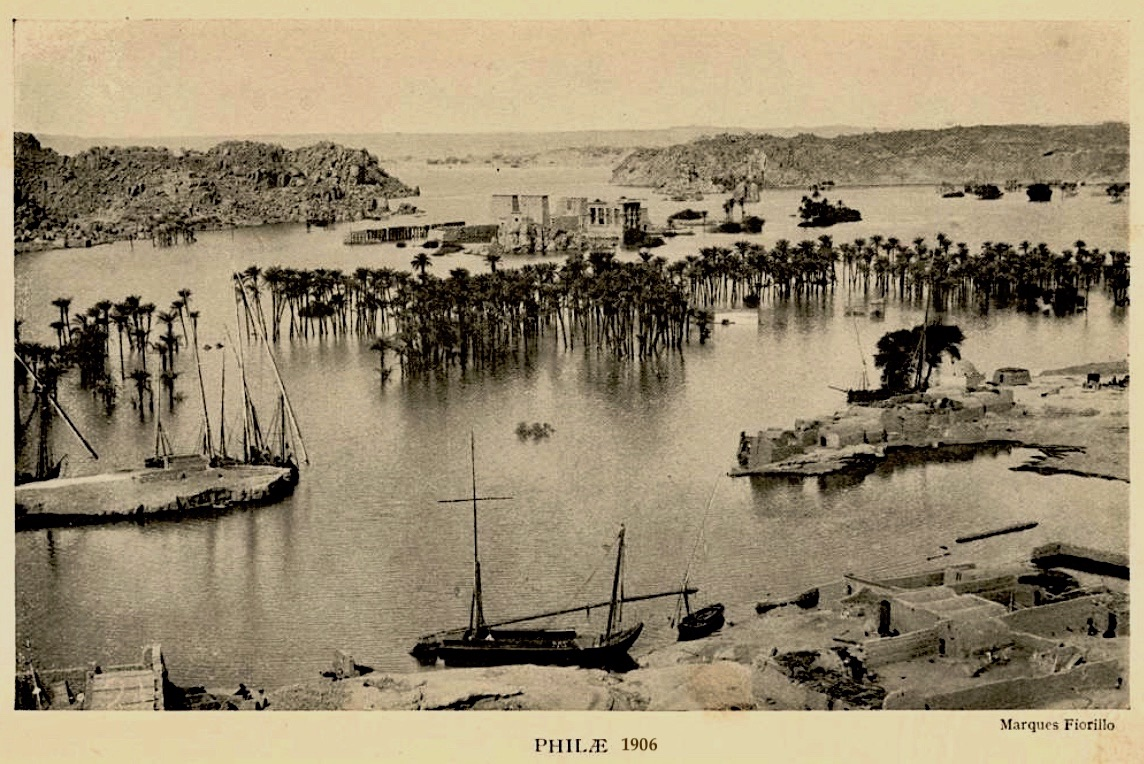
Philae flooded by the Aswan Low Dam in 1906

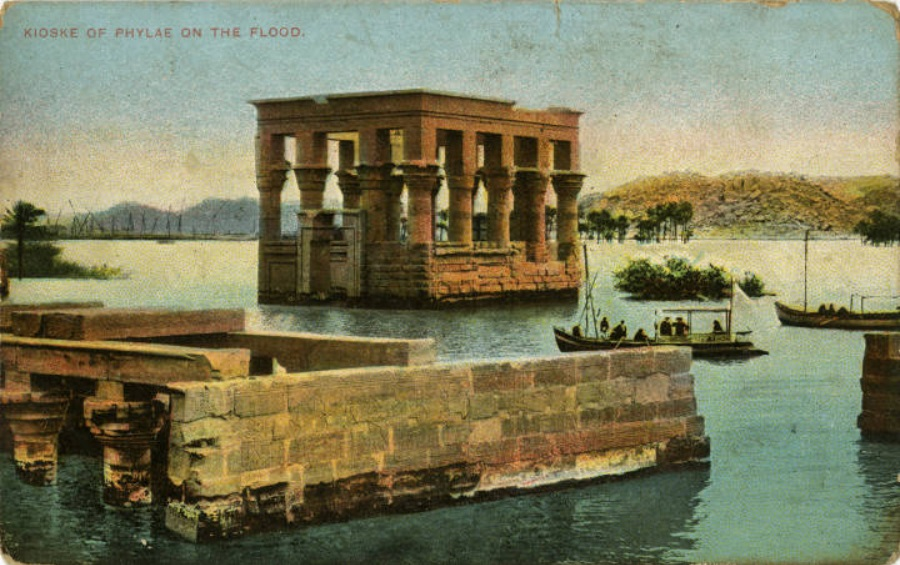
Kiosk of Emperor Trajan on Philae Island before relocation

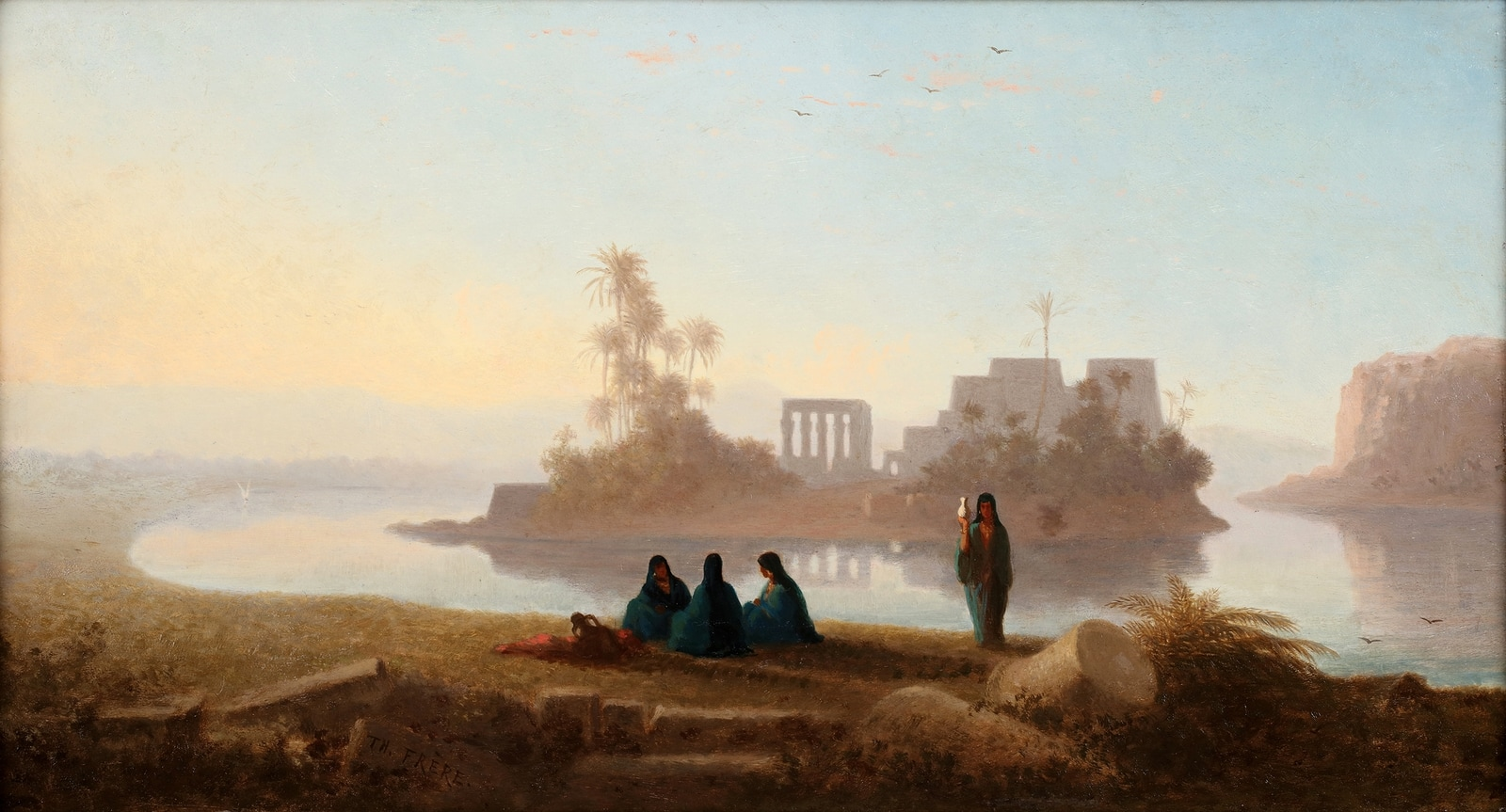
The temple of Philae by Théodore Frère

In 1902, the Aswan Low Dam was completed on the Nile River by the British. This threatened to submerge many ancient landmarks, including the temple complex of Philae. However, the British prioritized the advancement of Modern Egypt at the expense of the complex. The height of the dam was raised twice, from 1907 to 1912 and from 1929 to 1934, and the island of Philae was nearly always flooded. In fact, the only times that the complex was not underwater was when the dam's sluices were open from July to October.

It was proposed that the temples be relocated, piece by piece, to nearby islands, such as Bigeh or Elephantine. However, the temples' foundations and other architectural supporting structures were strengthened instead. Although the buildings were physically secure, the island's attractive vegetation and the colors of the temples' reliefs were washed away. Also, the bricks of the Philae temples soon became encrusted with silt and other debris carried by the Nile.

==== Rescue project ====
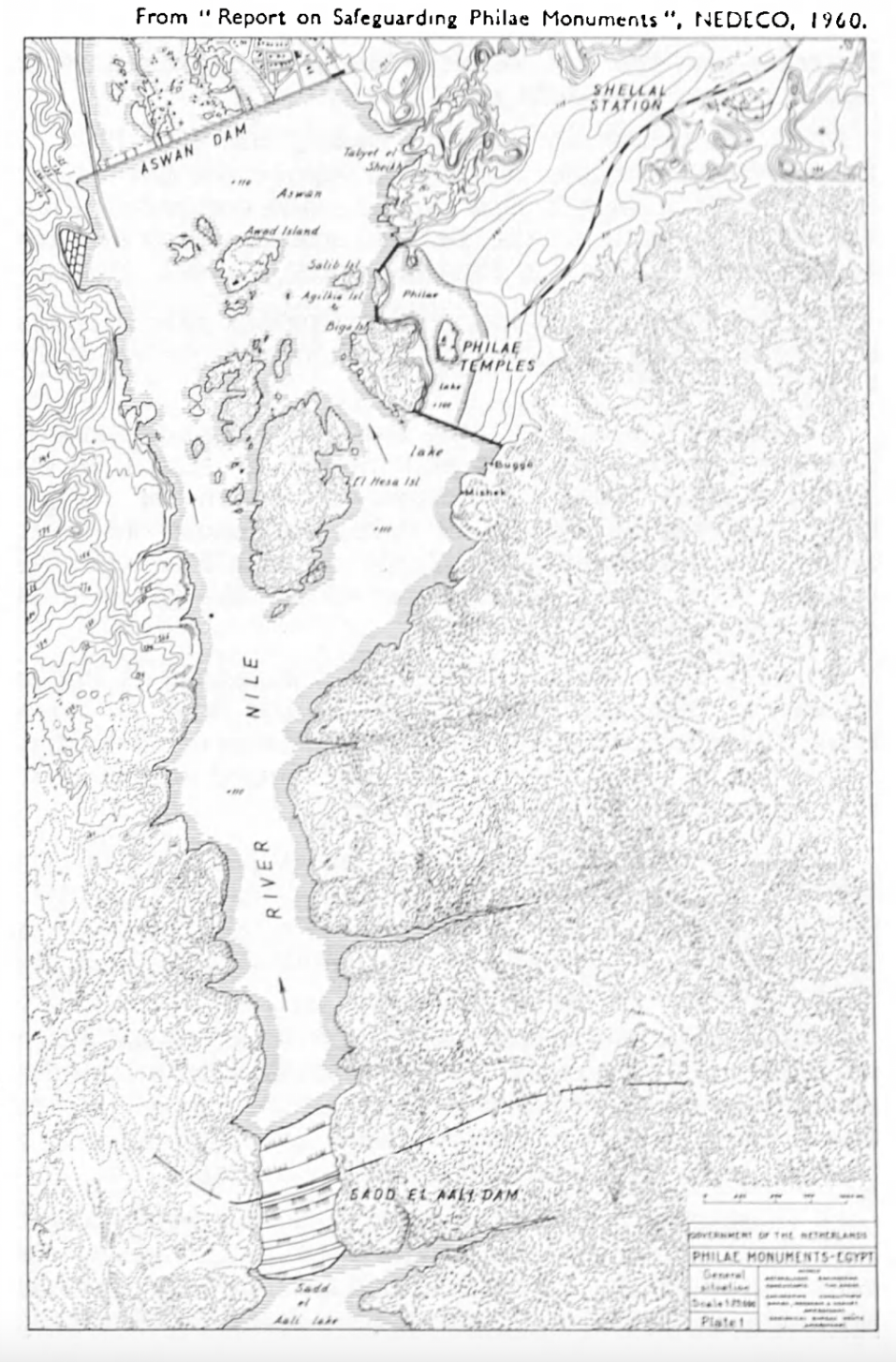
Map by UNESCO about the initial plan to save the Philae temple complex by building three dams and creating a separate lake with lower water levels to keep Philae Island dry. It was ultimately scrapped due to costs in favor of reassembling the complex on Agilkia Island.

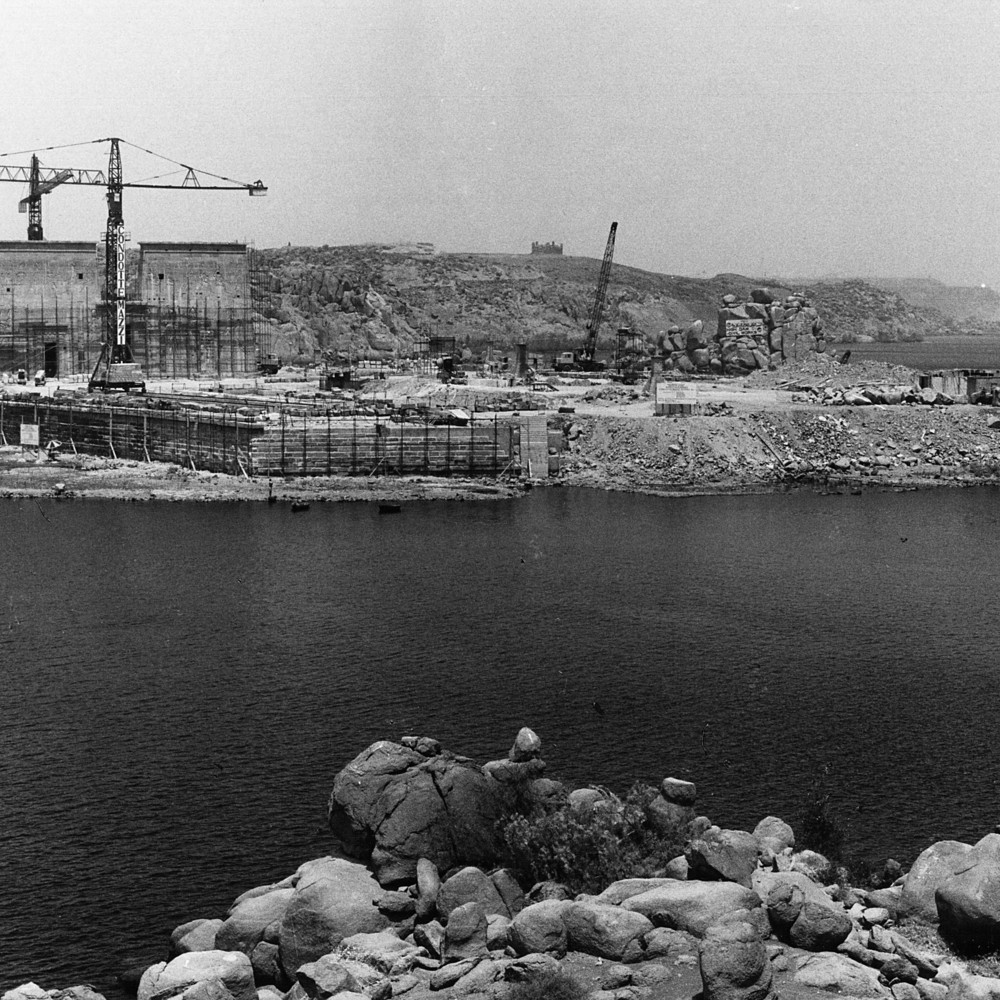
The Philae temple complex is reassembled on Agilkia Island after having been moved in the 1970s to save it from flooding.

The temples had been practically intact since the ancient days, but with each inundation the situation worsened and in the 1960s the island was submerged up to a third of the buildings all year round.

In 1960 UNESCO started a project to try to save the buildings on the island from the destructive effect of the ever-increasing waters of the Nile. Initially, it was proposed to build three dams and creating a separate lake with lower water levels close to pre-1902 Nile levels for Philae. However, the cost of this proposal meant it was ultimately scrapped in favor of relocation.

First, a large coffer dam was built, constructed of two rows of steel plates between which a 1 million cubic metres (35 million cubic feet) of sand was tipped. Any water that seeped through was pumped away.

External images
- large image with watermarks
- Another view of the remnants

Next, the monuments were cleaned and measured using photogrammetry, a method that enables the exact reconstruction of the original size of the building blocks that were used by the ancients. Then every building was dismantled into about 40,000 units from 2 to 25 tons, and then transported to the nearby Island of Agilkia, situated on higher ground some 500 metres (1,600 ft) away. To allow Agilkia island to accommodate the relocated temple, the island was leveled to match the old contours of Philae island as best as possible, which required the removal of the top of the island. The transfer itself took place between 1977 and 1979.

== Nearby locations of interest ==
Prior to the inundation, a little west of Philae lay a larger island, anciently called Snem or Senmut, but now Bigeh. It is very steep, and from its most elevated peak affords a fine view of the Nile, from its smooth surface south of the islands to its plunge over the shelves of rock that form the First Cataract. Philae, Bigeh and another lesser island divided the river into four principal streams, and north of them it took a rapid turn to the west and then to the north, where the cataract begins.

Bigeh, like Philae, was a holy island; its ruins and rocks are inscribed with the names and titles of Amenhotep III, Ramesses II, Psamtik II, Apries, and Amasis II, together with memorials of the later Macedonian and Roman rulers of Egypt. Its principal ruins consisted of the propylon and two columns of a temple, which was apparently of small dimensions, but of elegant proportions. Near them were the fragments of two colossal granite statues and also an excellent piece of masonry of much later date, having the aspect of an arch belonging to a church or mosque.

== Gallery ==
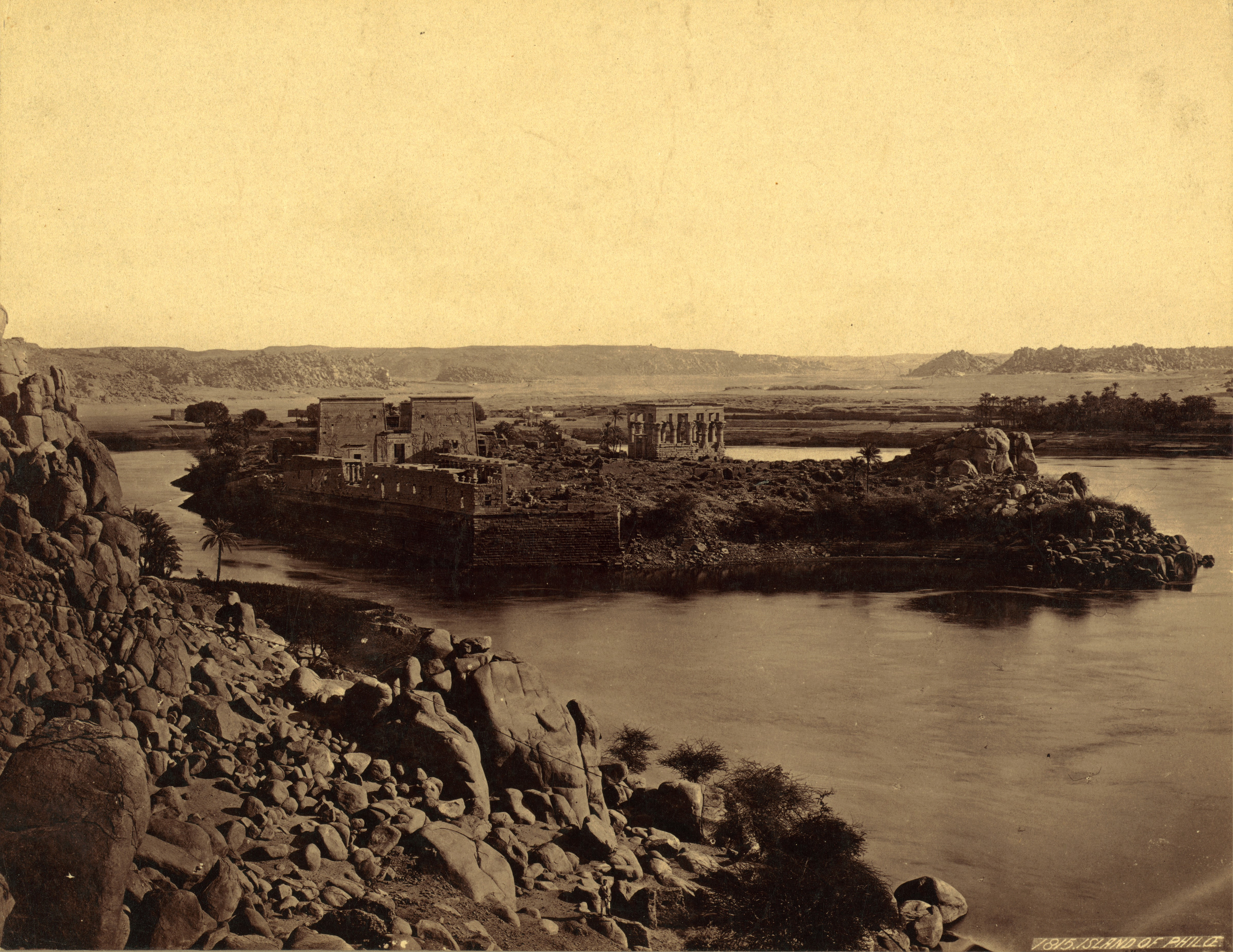
1856 photo

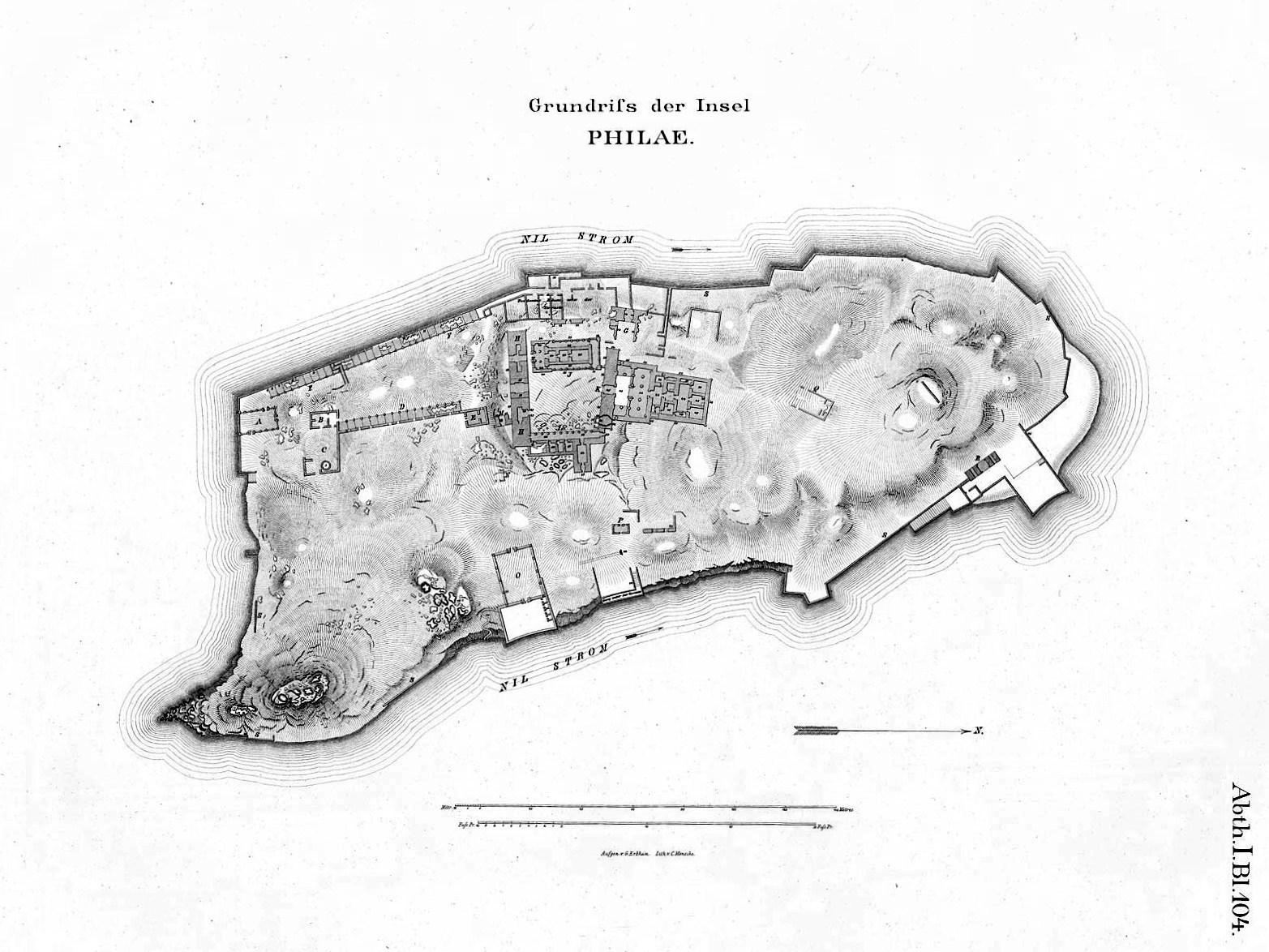
Map of Philae with floor plan of the Temple of Isis

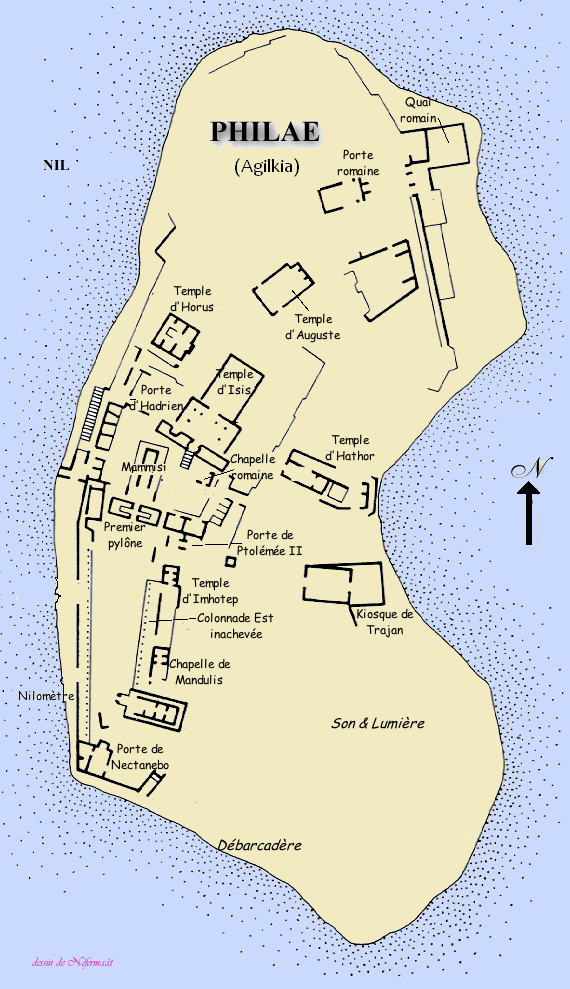
Agilkia Island, where the temple complex was moved in the 20th century

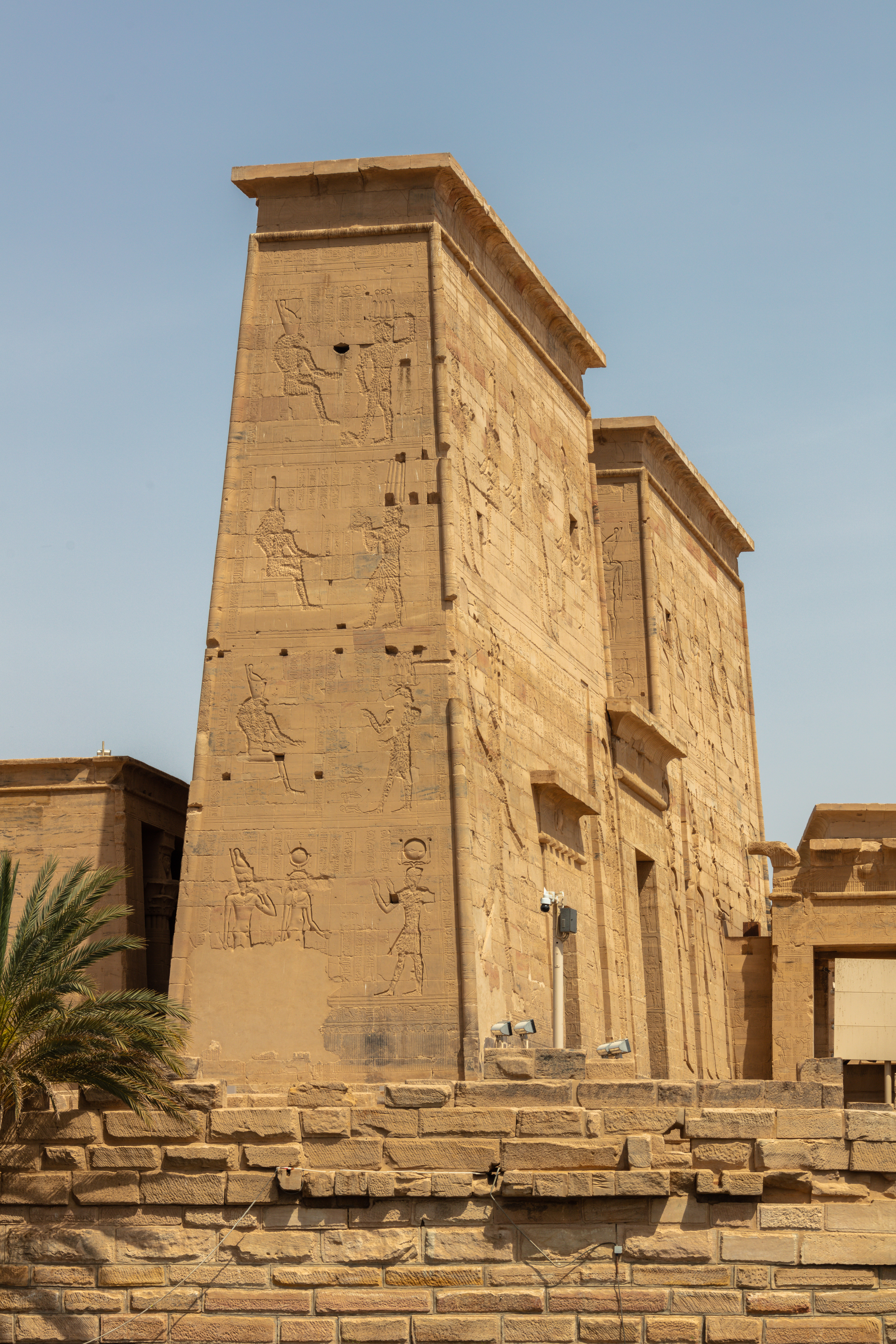
First pylon and colonnade

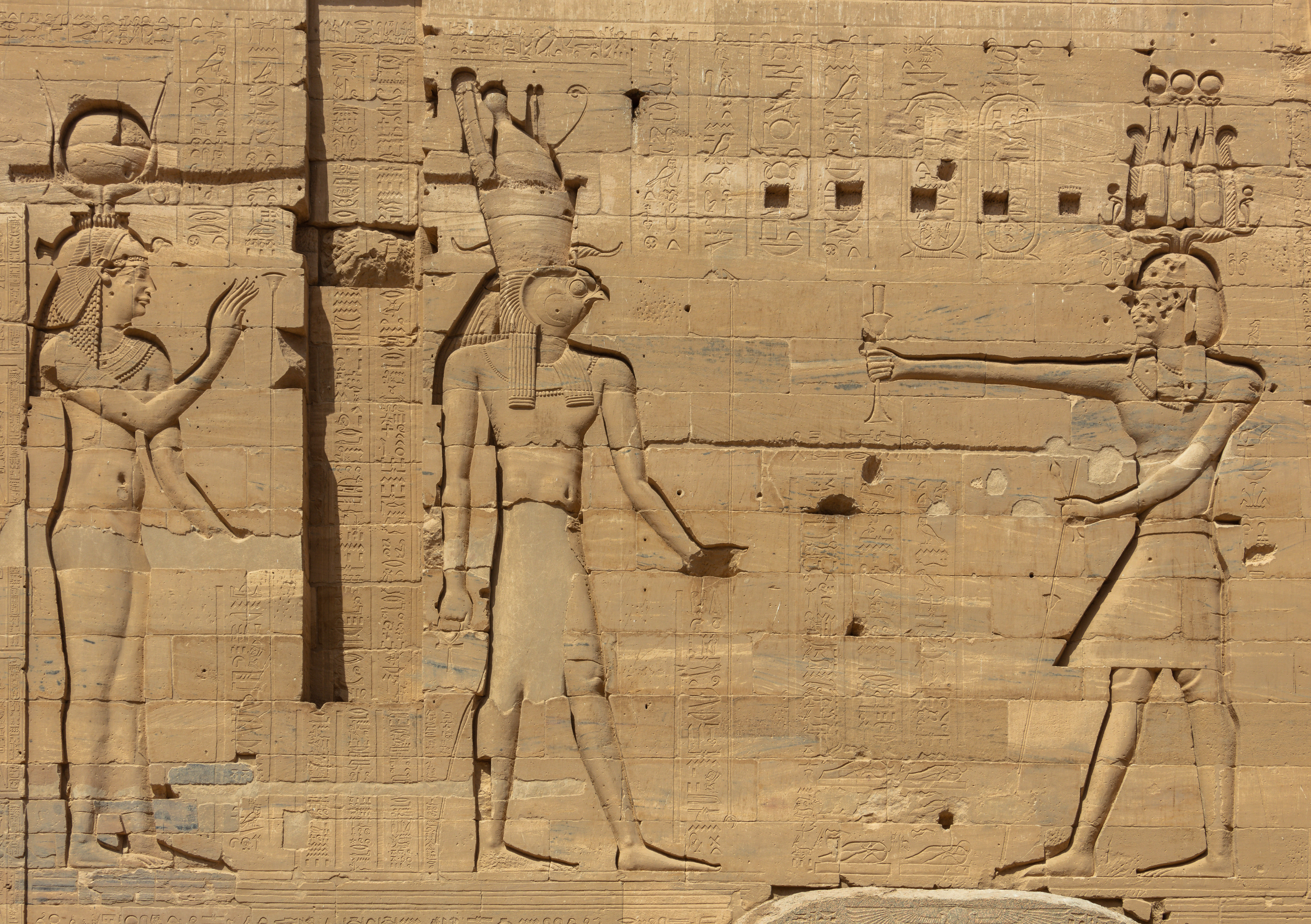
Temple hieroglyphs at Philae

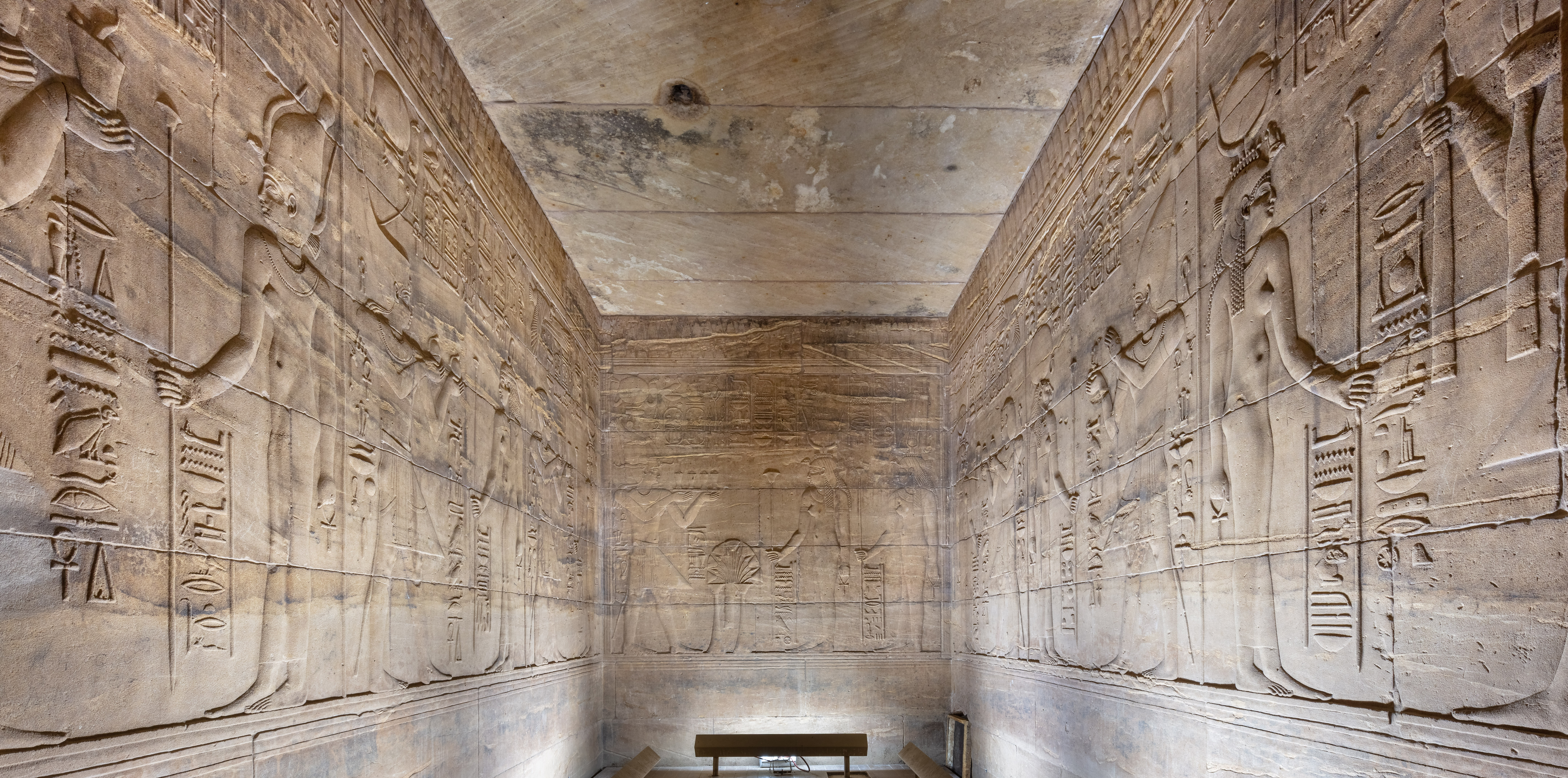
Interior

Interior

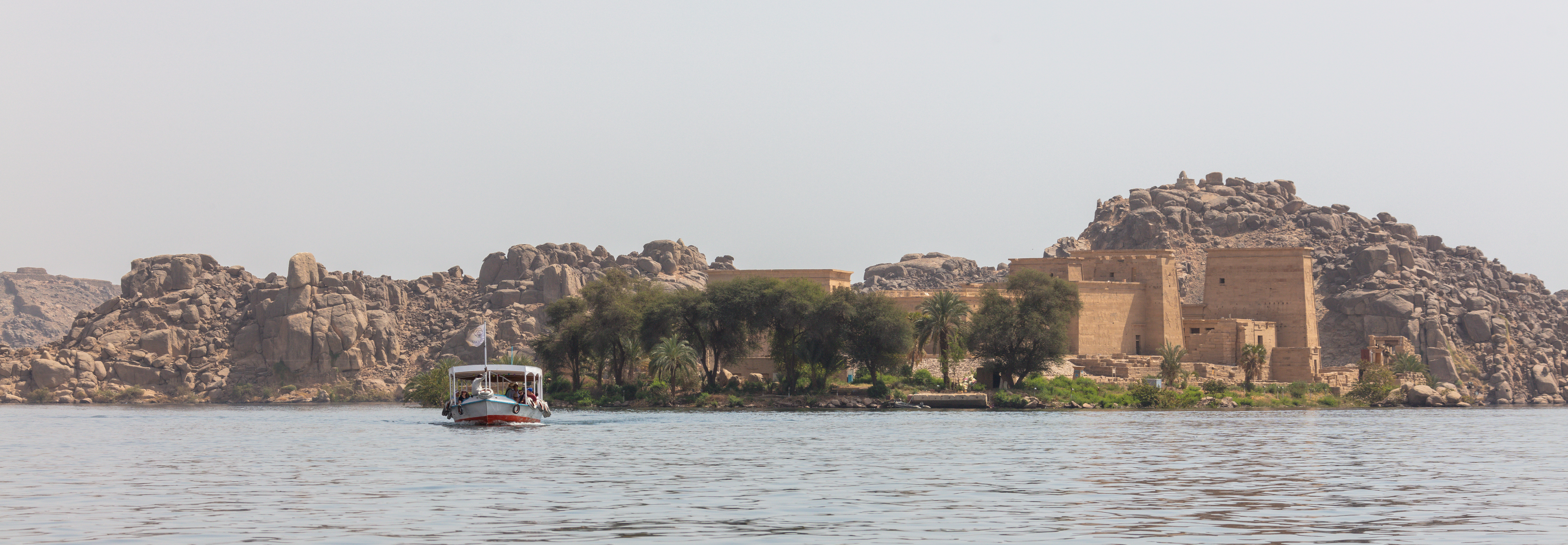
Temple of Isis from the west

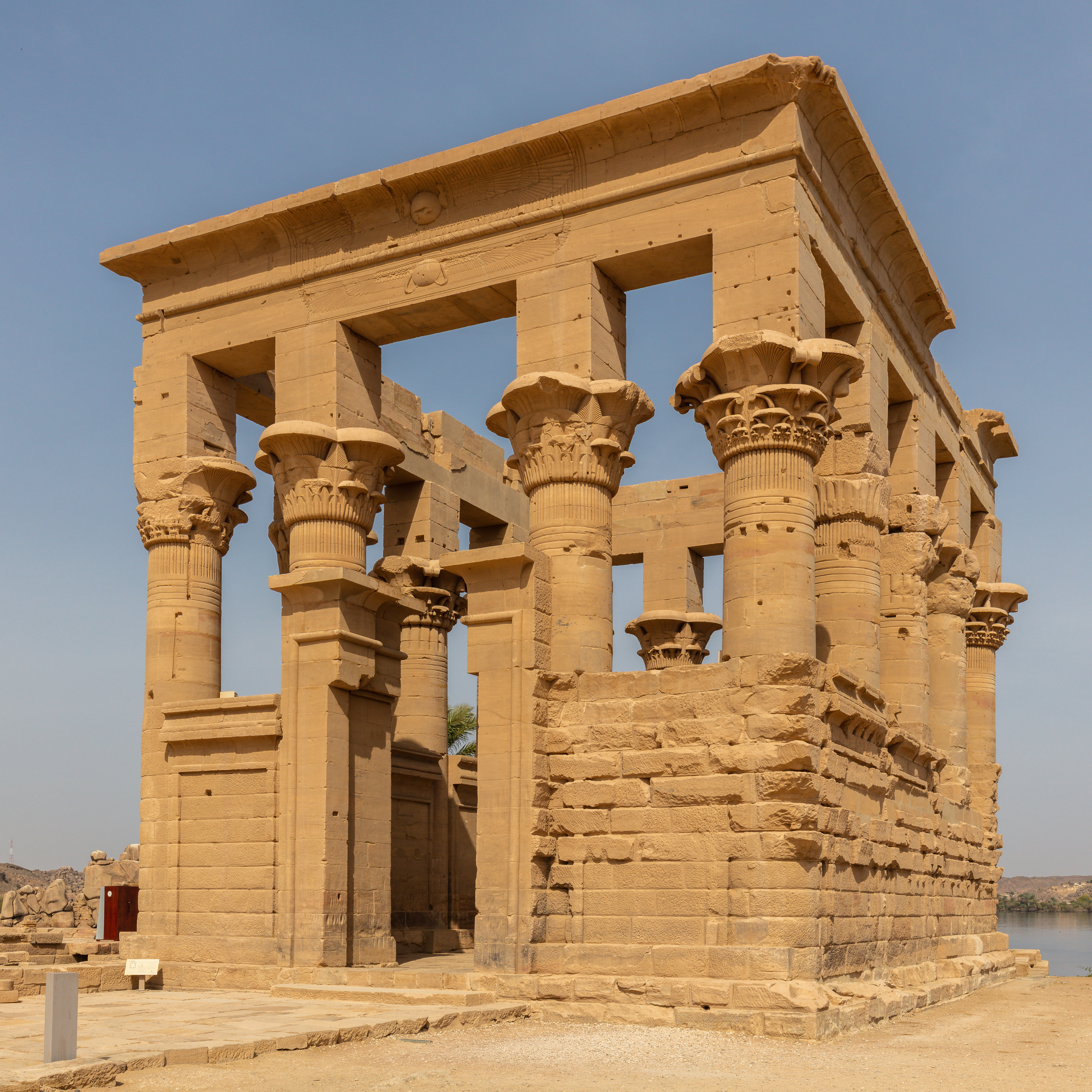
Trajan's Kiosk of Philae

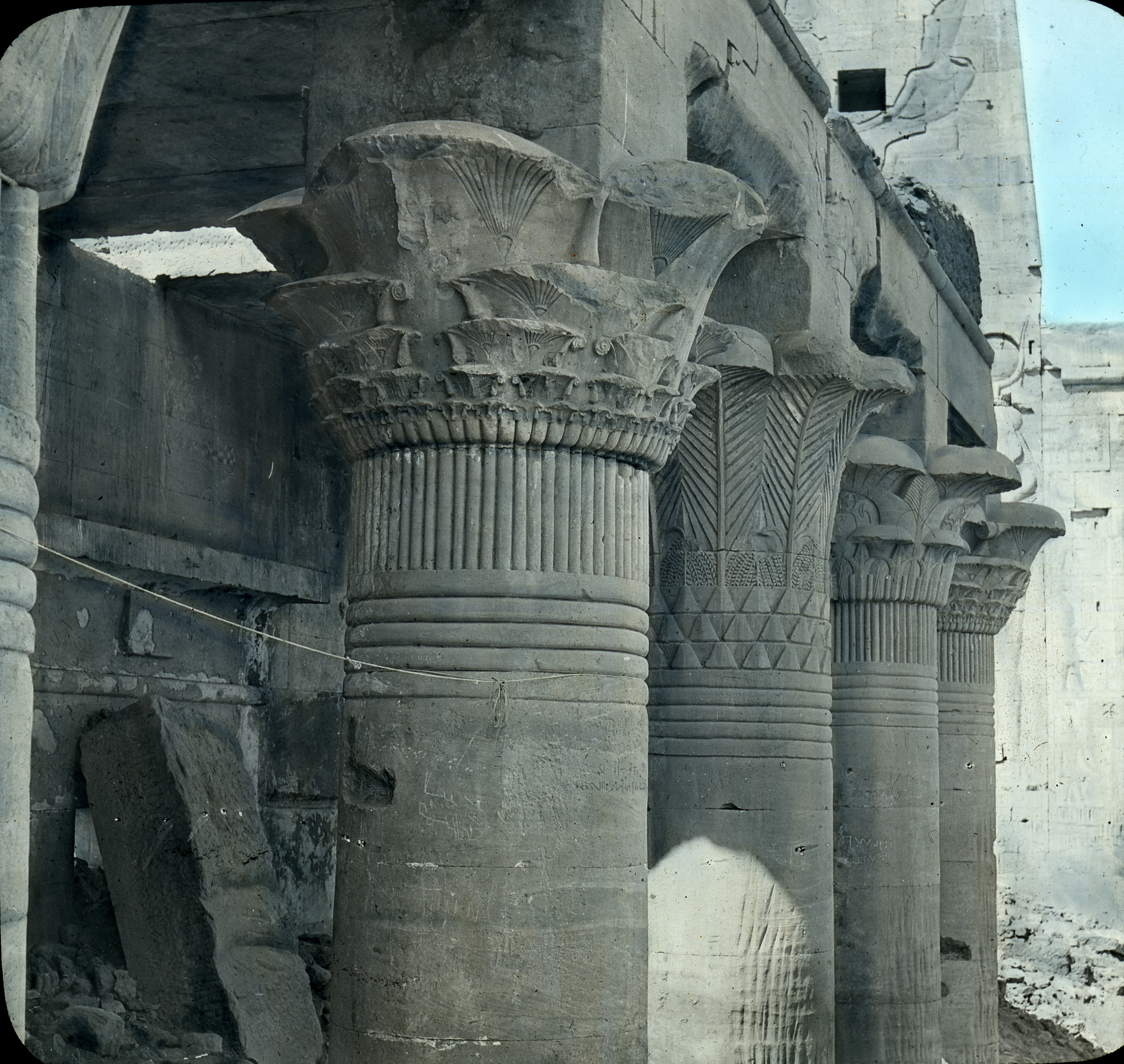
Lantern Slide Collection: Views, Objects: Egypt - Philae. Temple of Isis. Capitals of east colonnade., n.d., Joseph Hawkes. Brooklyn Museum Archives

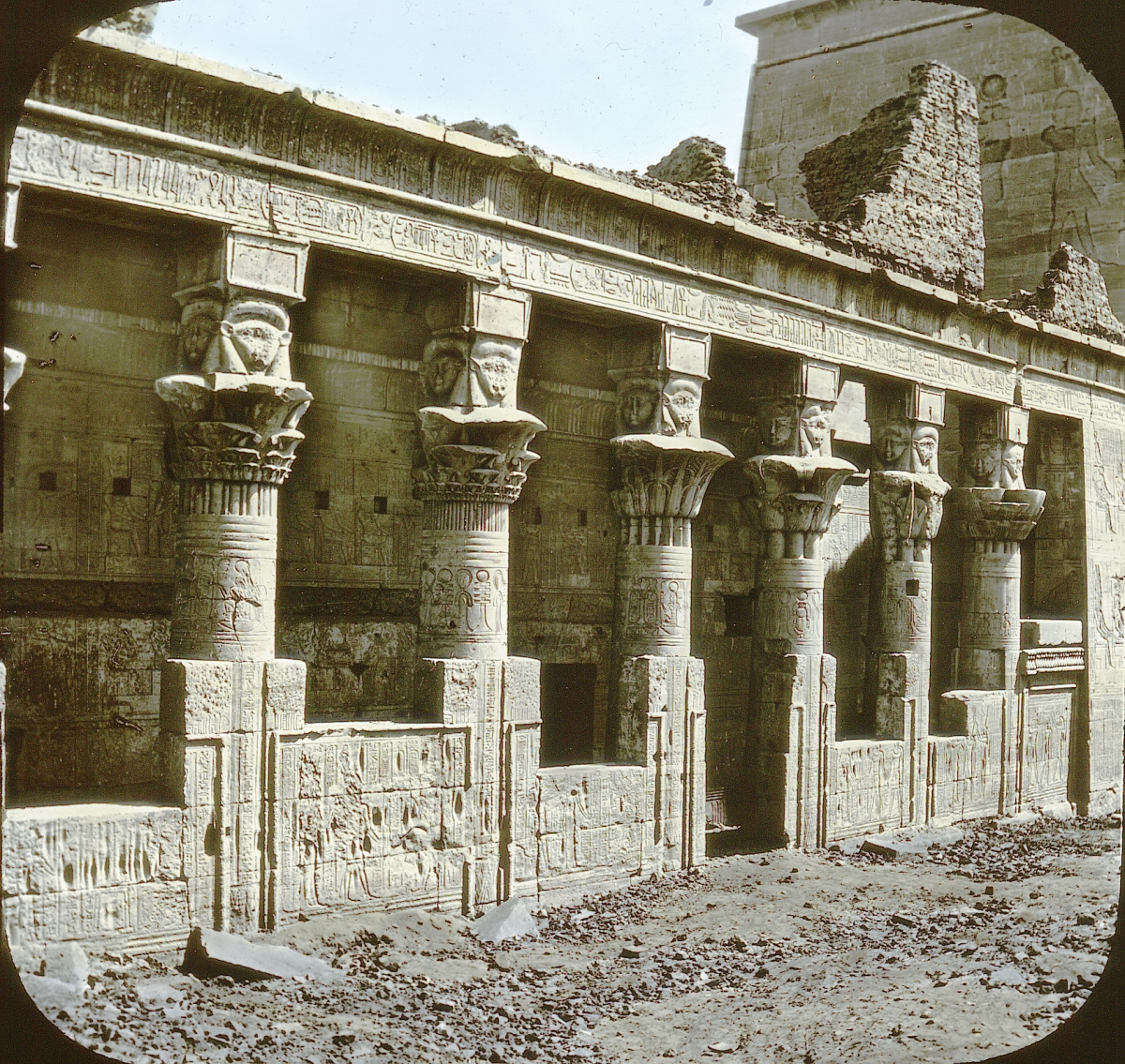
Mammisi (Birth-house). Brooklyn Museum Archives, Goodyear Archival Collection

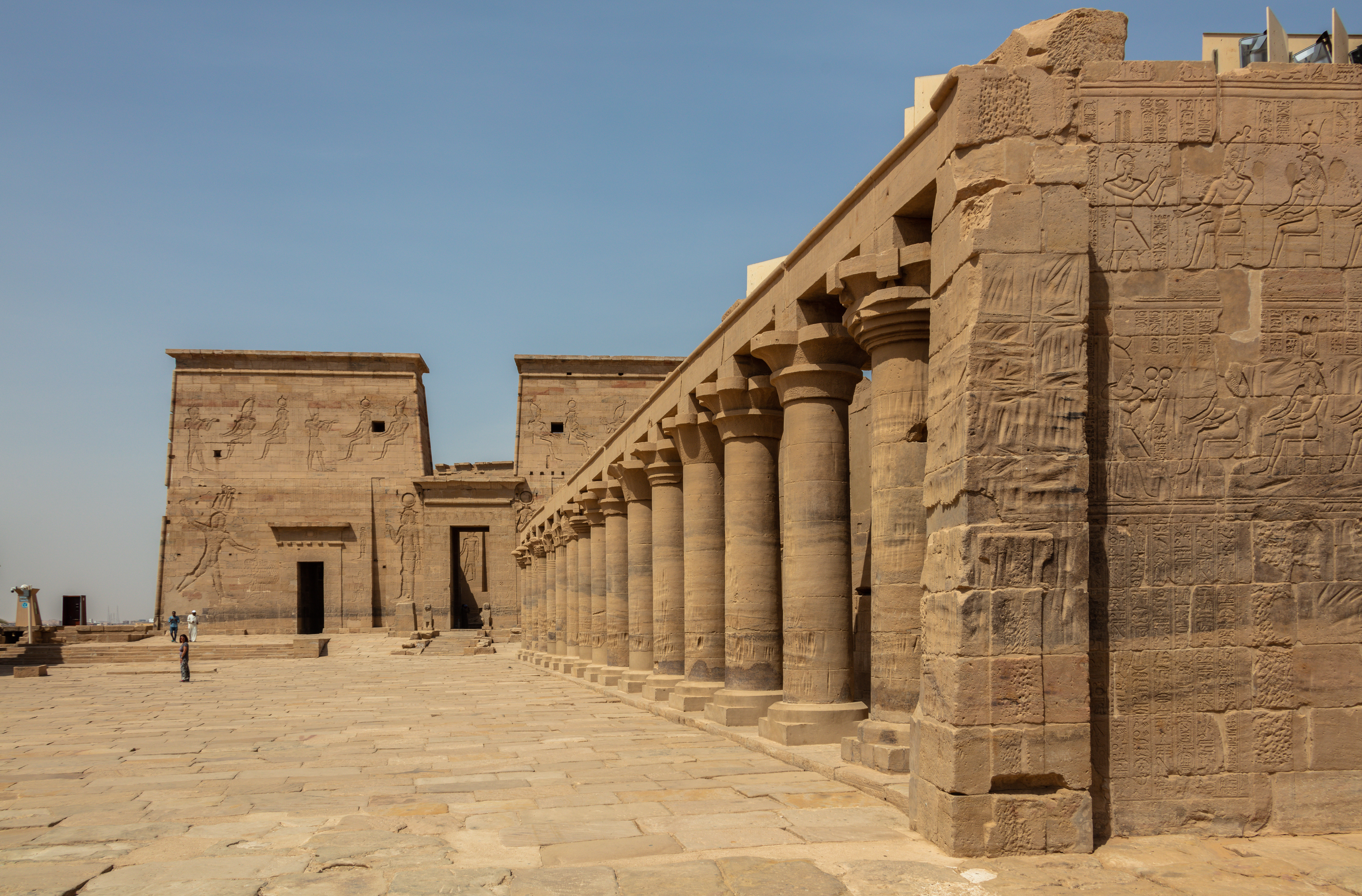
Eastern colonnade in the outer or the forecourt

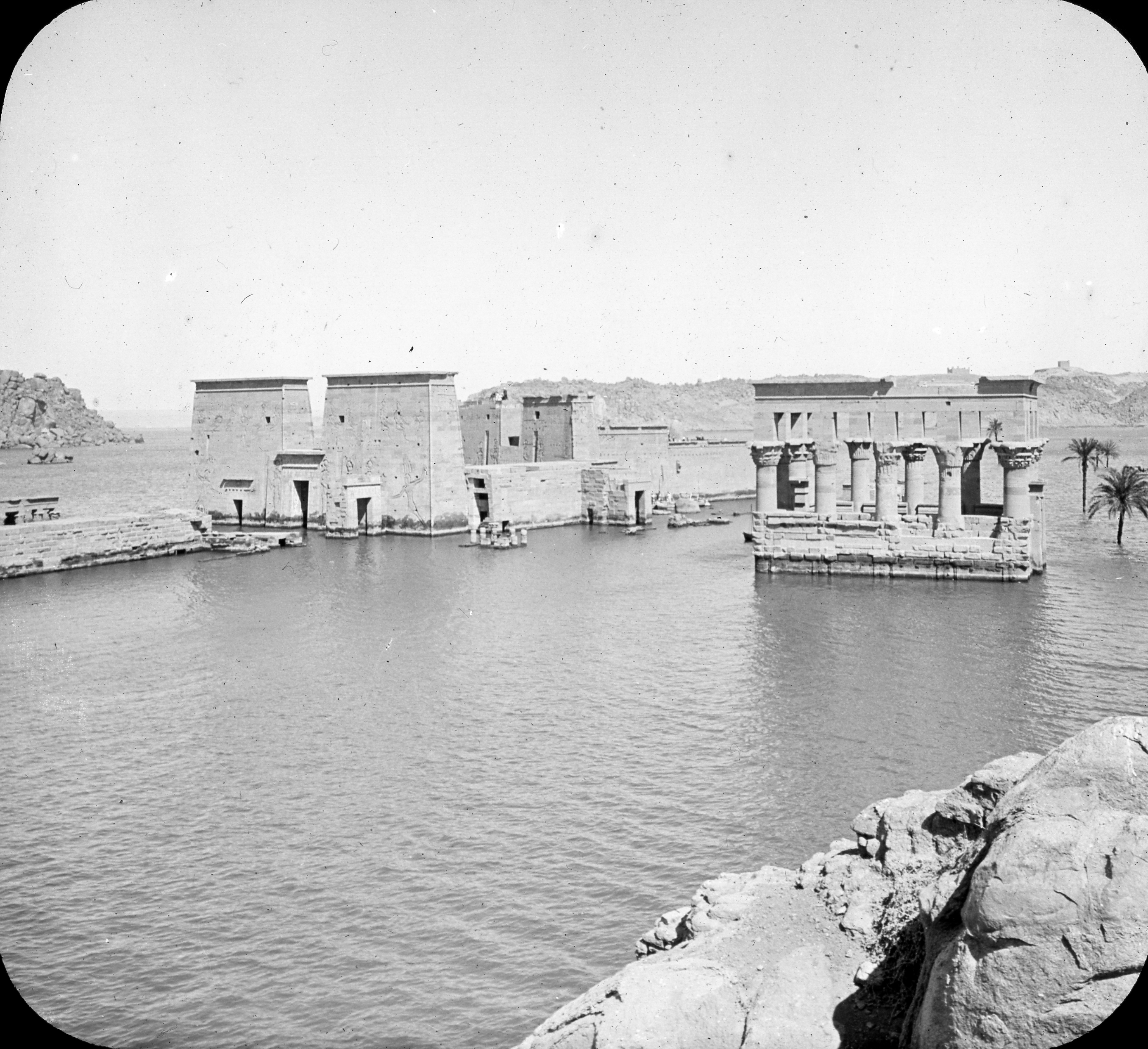
General view of Temple of Philae during flood, 1908, Brooklyn Museum Archives

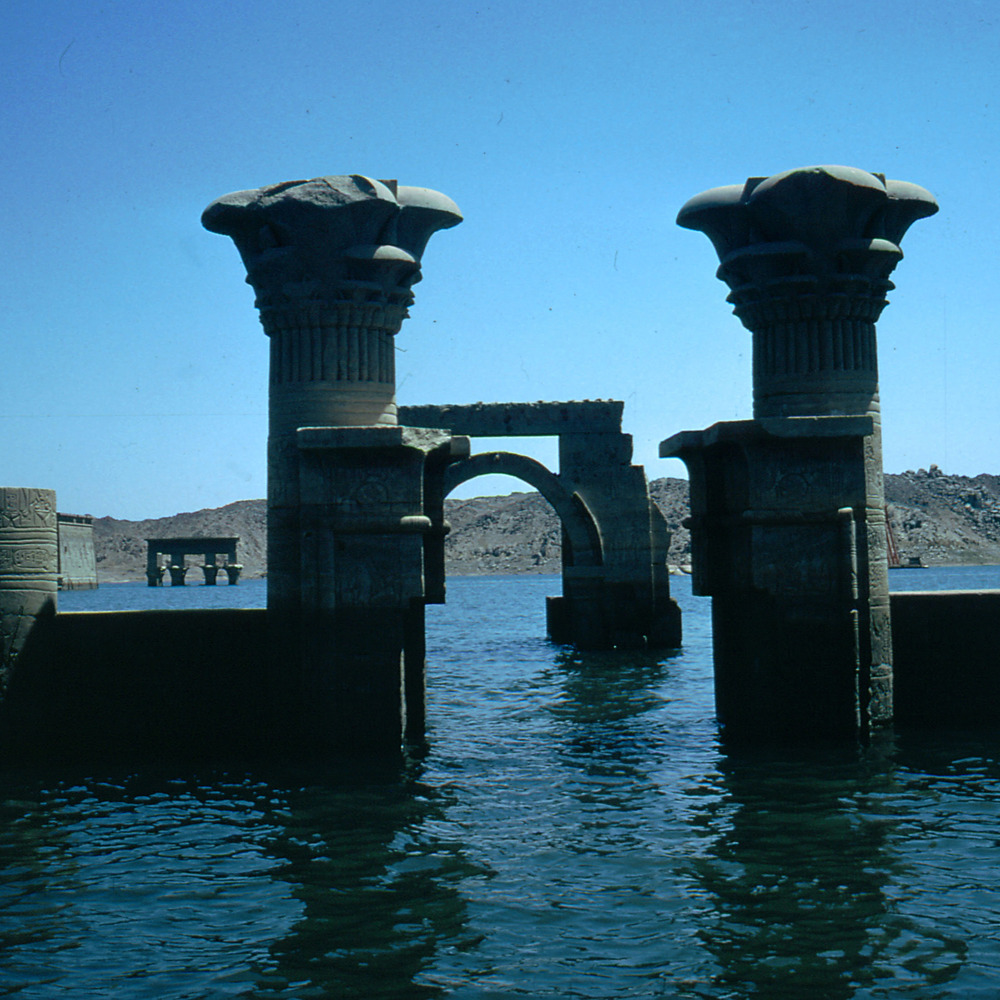
Sanctuary of Isis, flood (2 January 1969)

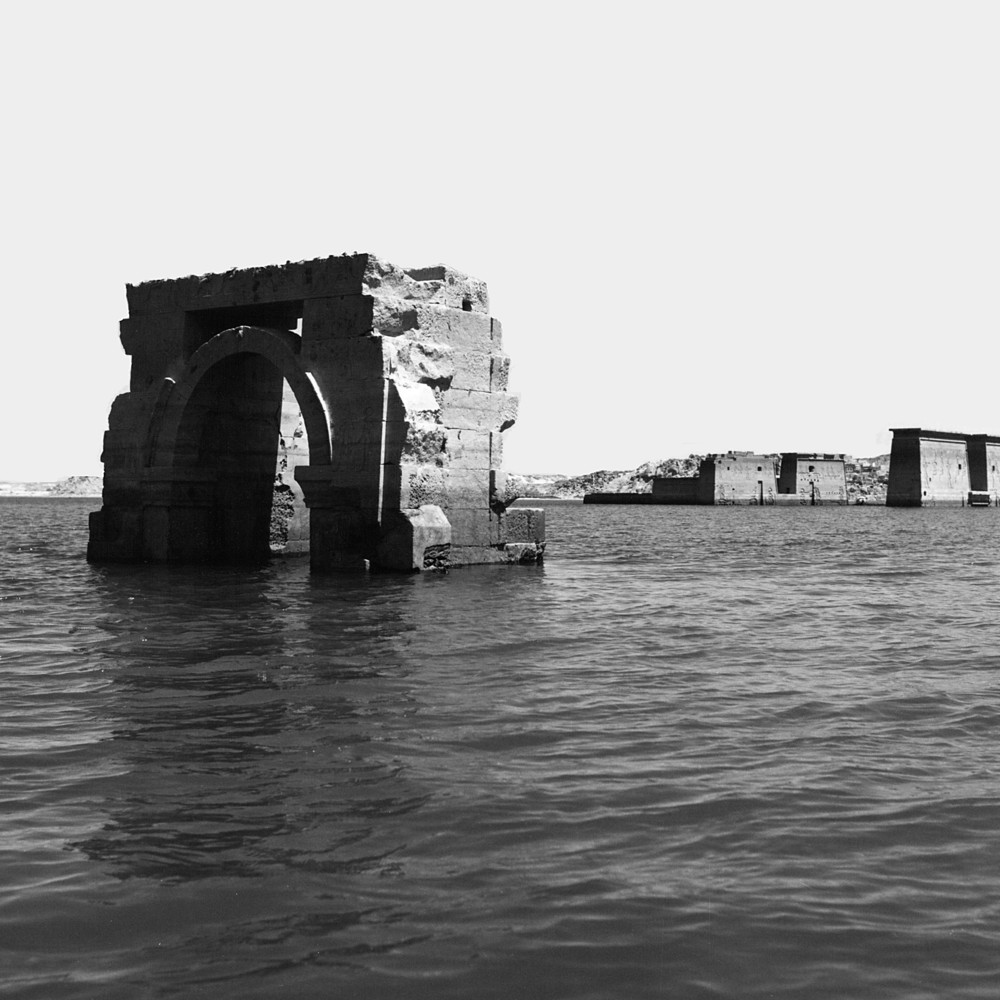
Pavillon of Trajan, 1960

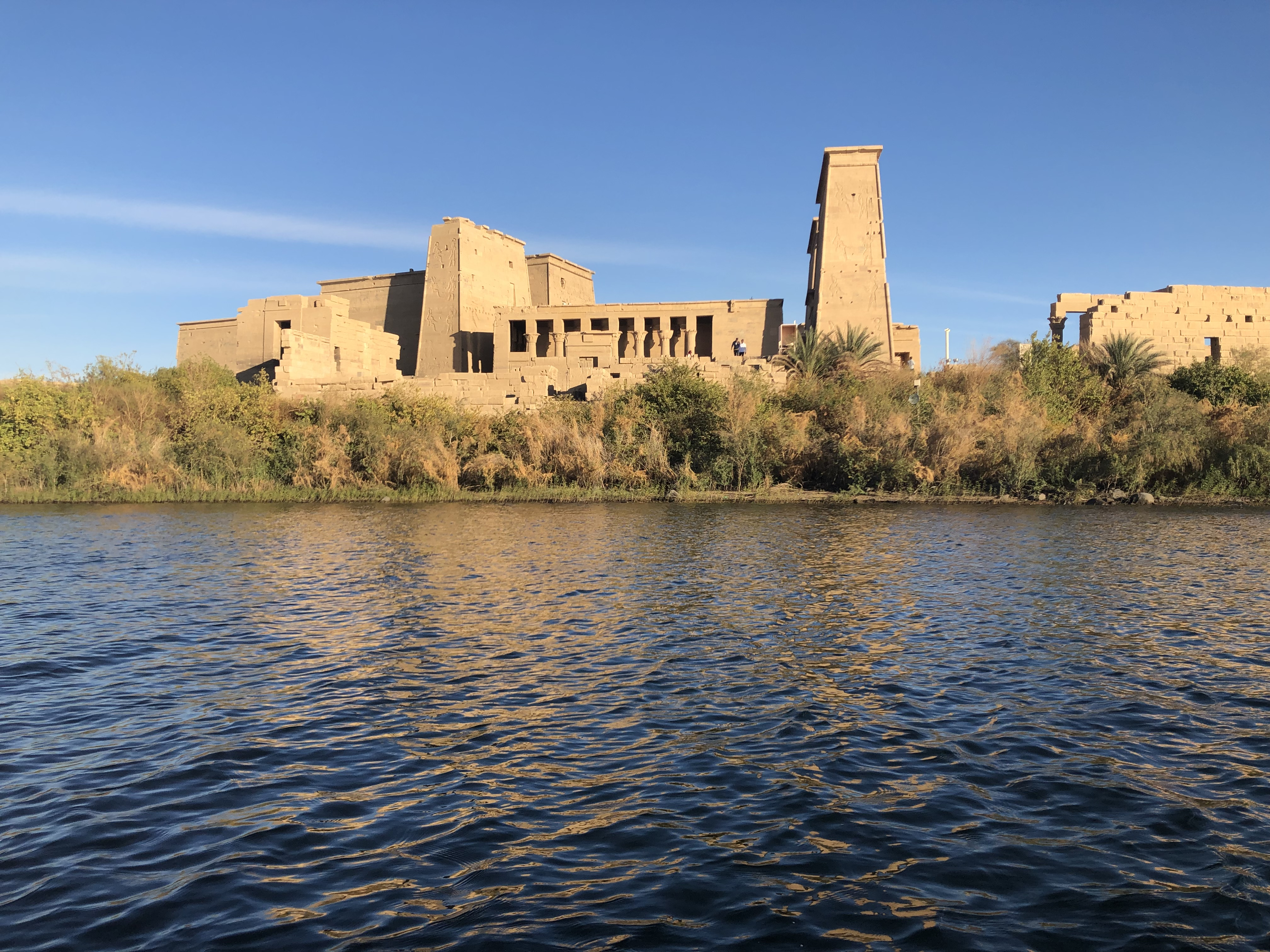
Temple of Philae as seen from a boat

Temple of Isis, 2025

== See also ==
- Abu Simbel temples
- Diocese of Philae
- Luxor
