= Agilkia Island =

Island in the Nile River, present site of the relocated temple complex of Philae

Coordinates: 24°01′31″N 32°53′03″E

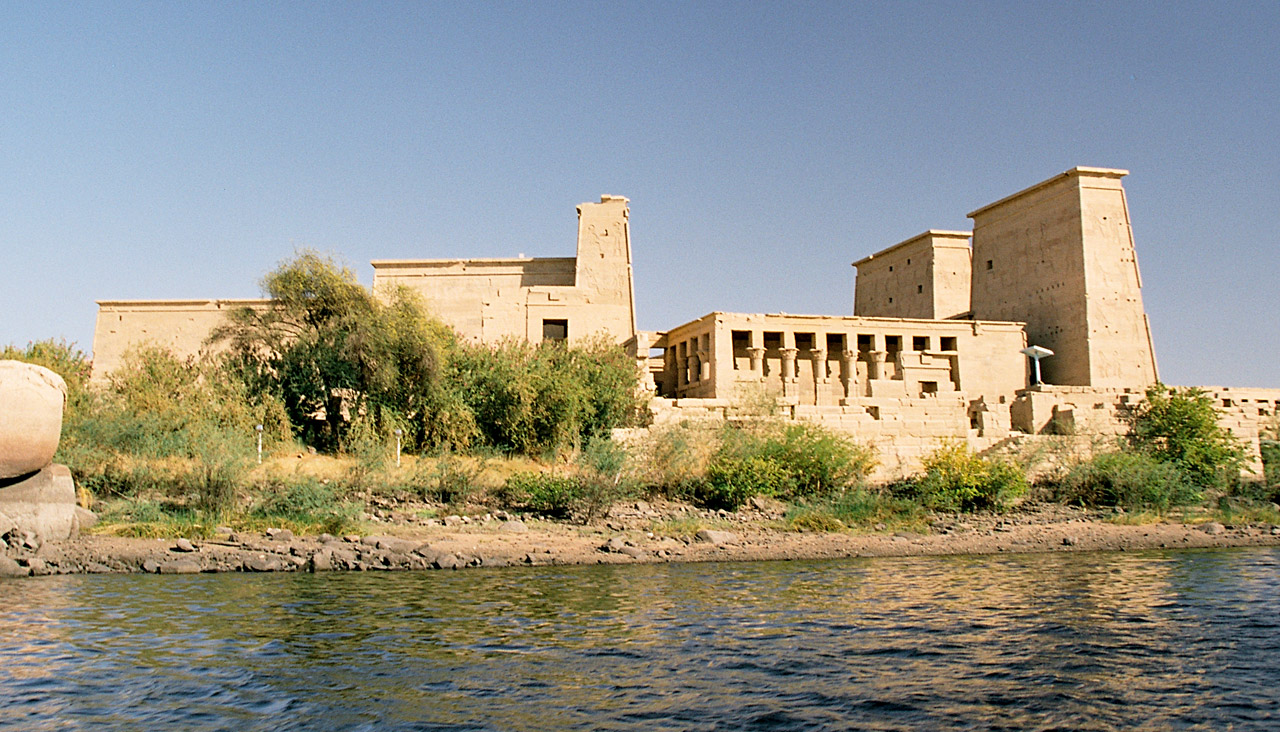
Philae temple on Agilkia Island as seen from the Nile

Agilkia Island (also called Agilika; Arabic: أجيليكا, from Old Nubian: ⲁ̅ⲅⲗ̅, romanised: agil, "mouth") is an island in the reservoir of the Old Aswan Dam along the Nile River in southern Egypt; it is the present site of the relocated ancient Egyptian temple complex of Philae. Partially to completely flooded by the old dam's construction in 1902, the Philae complex was dismantled and relocated to Agilkia island, as part of a wider UNESCO project related to the 1960s construction of the Aswan High Dam and the eventual flooding of many sites posed by its large reservoir upstream. To allow Agilkia island to accommodate the relocated temple, the island was leveled to match the old contours of Philae island as best as possible, which required the removal of the top of the island.

Agilkia, like the island, was the name chosen for the planned landing site on a comet by the Rosetta spacecraft mission's Philae lander. Upon initial touchdown, however, the lander took a large bounce followed by a smaller one before finally coming to rest perhaps a kilometre away from Agilkia, at a site named Abydos, after the ancient Egyptian city.
