= Ramming =

Military combat technique

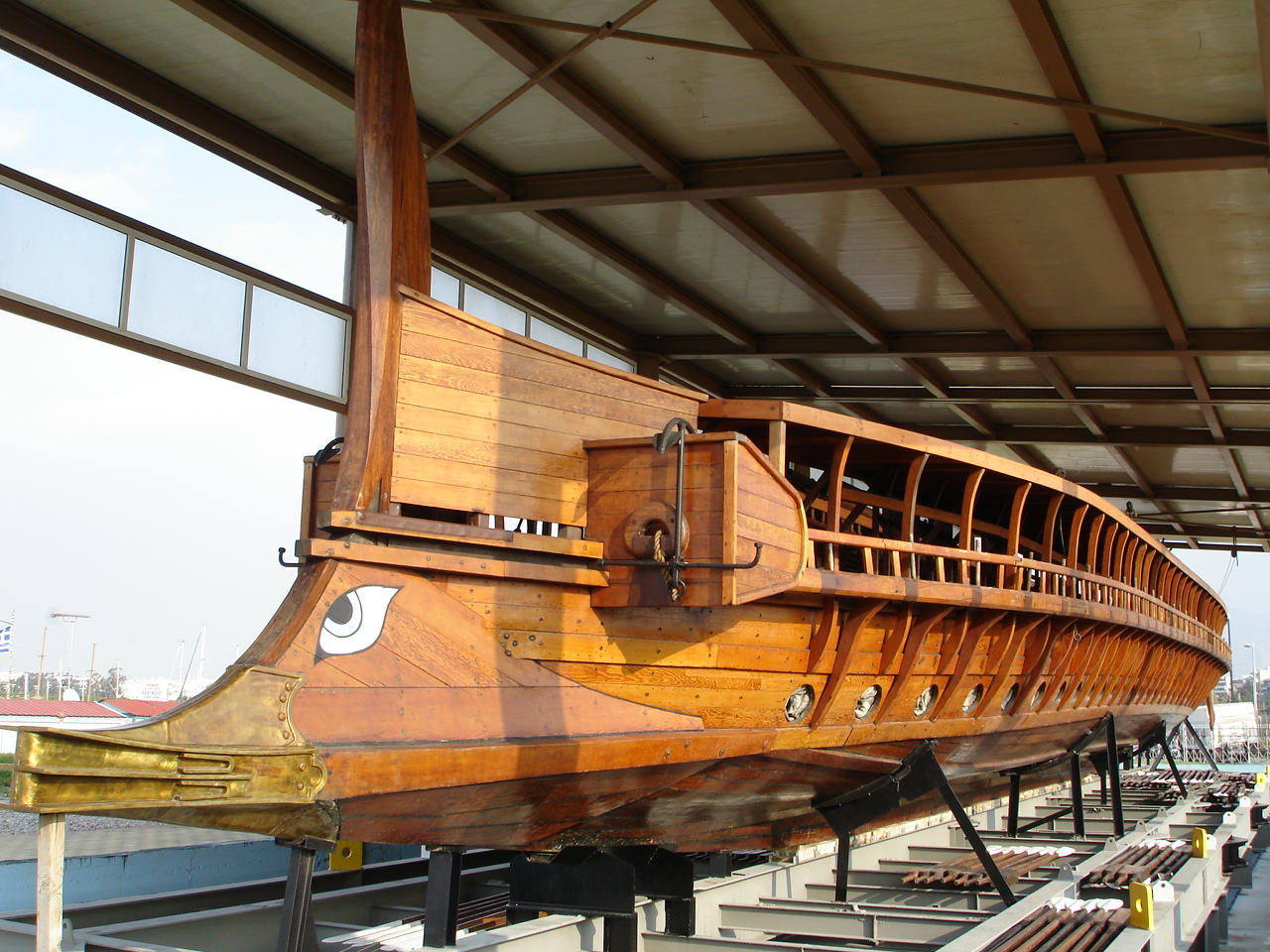
The ram of Olympias, a reconstruction of an ancient Athenian trireme.

In warfare, ramming is a technique used in air, sea, and land combat. The term originated from the battering ram, a siege engine used to bring down fortifications by hitting it with the force of the ram's momentum, and ultimately from male sheep. Thus, in warfare, ramming refers to hitting a target by running oneself into the target.

Today, hand-held battering rams are one tool among many used by law enforcement and military personnel for door breaching. Forcible entry by criminals has been implemented using such methods as vehicles rammed into buildings or driven into crowds to provoke massive casualties by lone-wolf terrorists.

== Naval warfare ==
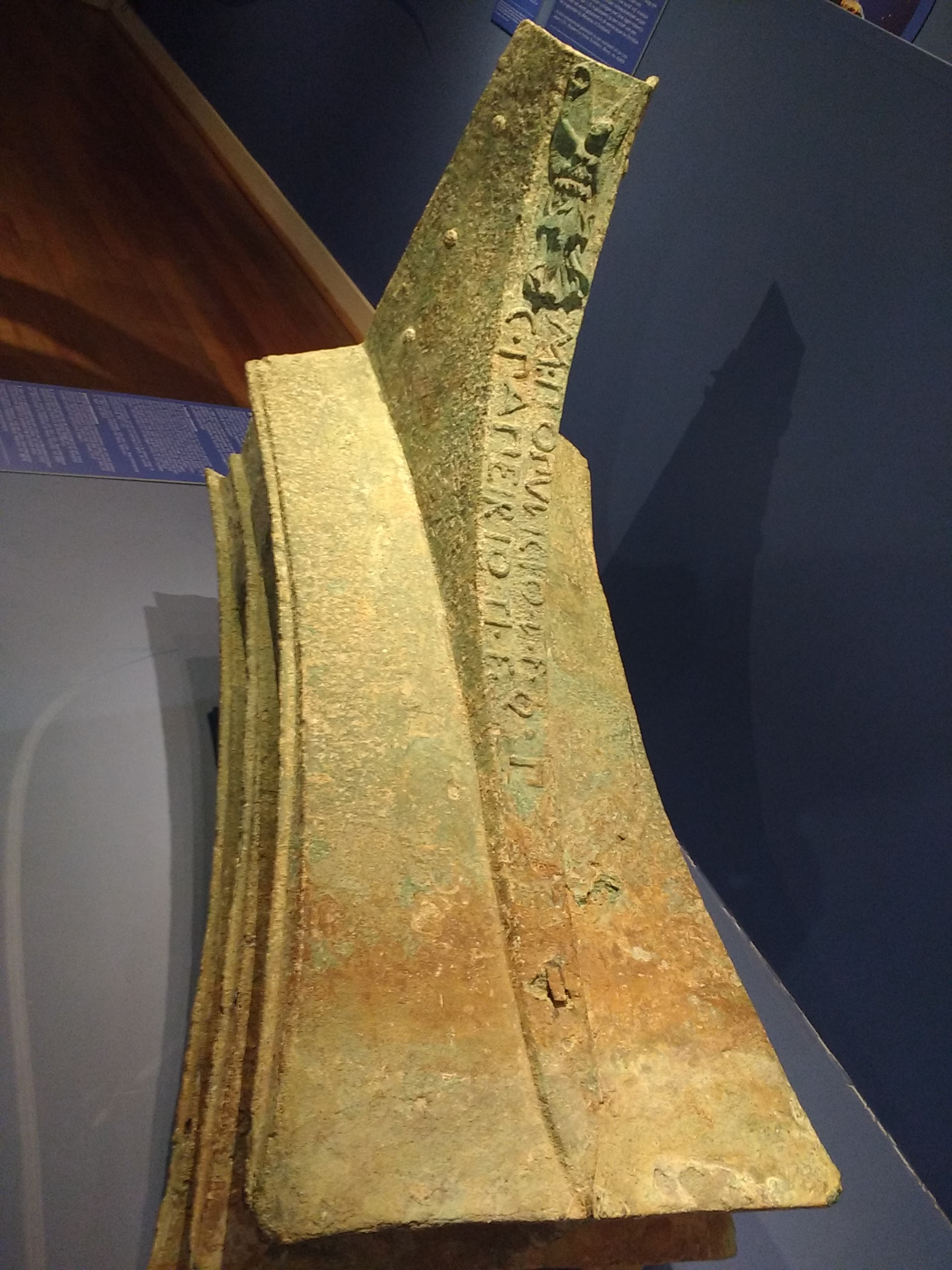
Bronze Roman naval ram, dated before 241 B.C. Includes winged decoration of the goddess of Victory.

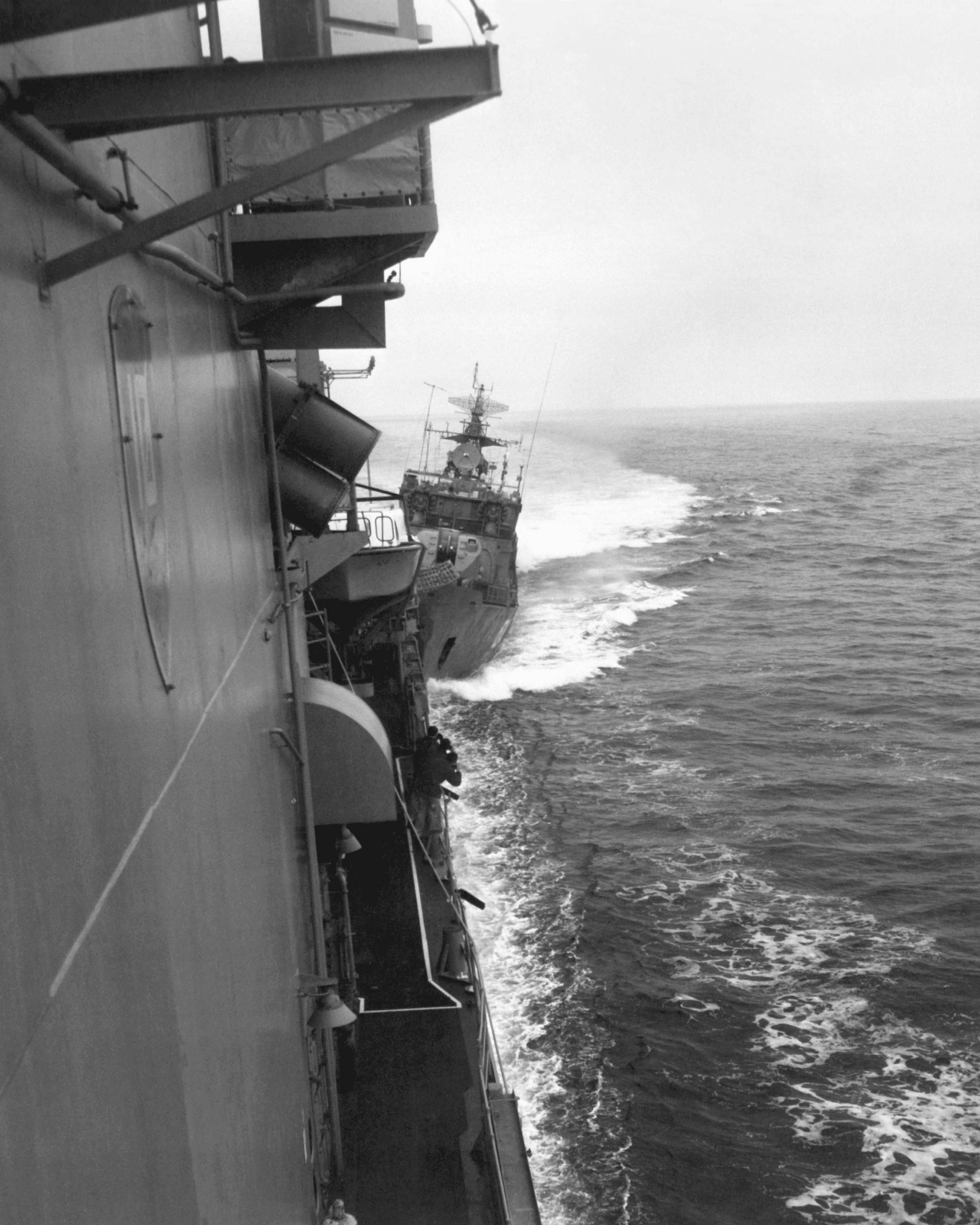
View from U.S. destroyer Caron at the moment of ramming by Soviet light frigate FFL 824 on 12 February 1988

Navies in antiquity commonly used the ram: the "beak" (Latin: rostrum) became an important part of the armament of the galleys of Imperial Rome. The ancient Greeks used their trireme vessels for ramming as well. In ancient China, rams were largely unknown, as the lack of a keel and the flat shape of the junk's bow was not conducive to constructing an elongated underwater spur.

The first recorded use of a ram in modern times in fighting between major warships occurred in the American Civil War at the Battle of Hampton Roads in March 1862, when the armored Confederate warship CSS Virginia rammed the Union frigate Cumberland, sinking her almost immediately.

Another significant use of the naval ram occurred during the Third Italian War of Independence (June to August 1866) at the Battle of Lissa, between Italy and Austria. The Italian ironclad Re d'Italia, damaged aft by gunfire, had no functioning rudder. Lying helpless in the water, she was struck three times by the Austrian ironclad Erzherzog Ferdinand Max, the flagship of the Austrian Commander-in-Chief Admiral Tegetthoff. The Austrian ship retreated unharmed as the Italian vessel rolled over and sank.

During the War of the Pacific of 1879-1884, the Peruvian ironclad Huascar repeatedly rammed the Chilean corvette Esmeralda, sinking the wooden steam- and wind-powered ship (May 1879).

During World War I (1914-1918), HMS Dreadnought rammed and sank German submarine U-29 in 1915. This was an incidental use of the ship's bow, however. In 1918 the British troop ship HMT Olympic rammed SM U-103 – the submarine sustained such heavy damage that its crew was forced to scuttle and abandon ship.

In World War II (1939-1945), naval ships often rammed other vessels, though this was often due to extraordinary circumstances, as considerable damage could be caused to the attacking ship. The damage that lightly-constructed destroyers took from using the tactic led the Royal Navy to officially discourage the practice from early 1943, after HMS Hesperus spent three months in dry dock following her sinking of U-357 in December 1942, and after HMS Harvester was torpedoed and sunk after damaging her propellers during the ramming of U-444 in March 1943. USS Buckley rammed and was rammed by U-66 in May 1944; and HMS Easton rammed U-458 in 1943.

On 29 January 1943 the New Zealander naval trawlers, Kiwi and Moa rammed and wrecked the Japanese submarine I-1 in shallow water at Kamimbo Bay, Guadalcanal, during Operation Ke. The submarine of 2,135 tons was much larger and more heavily armed than the minesweeping trawlers of 607 tons each.

On 5 November 1942 the Finnish submarine Vetehinen rammed the Soviet submarine Щ 305 in the Sea of Åland and sank it. Vetehinen was on a night patrol searching for Soviet submarines. A contact was found, and after confirmation of an enemy contact, Vetehinen launched a torpedo, which missed - probably due to launching at too short a distance. Vetehinen then opened fire with its deck guns and managed to damage the Soviet submarine, which by then had started an emergency dive. The captain of Vetehinen, determined not to let the other submarine escape, ordered his submarine to ram the other vessel, which at last was a success.

During anti-submarine action, ramming was an alternative if a destroyer was too close to a surfaced submarine for her main guns to fire into the water. The famous British anti-submarine specialist Captain Frederic John Walker used this tactic from December 1941 to the end of World War II.

The British destroyer HMS Campbeltown (formerly USS Buchanan, supplied under Lend-Lease) was disguised as a German destroyer for the purpose of ramming the gates of the Normandie dry dock at St. Nazaire on 28 March 1942. This action aimed to prevent the Normandie dock ever being used by the German battleship Tirpitz. (It was the only dock on the Wehrmacht-occupied Atlantic coast capable of repairing such a large vessel.) The operation succeeded, and a large explosive time-bomb charge hidden in the bow of the ship exploded the next day, putting the dock out of commission for five years.

On 2 August 1943, while returning from a "Tokyo Express" night reinforcement mission in the Solomon Islands, the Japanese destroyer Amagiri spotted USN PT boats at a range of about 1,000 yards. Rather than open fire—and give away their position—the destroyer captain, Lieutenant Commander Kohei Hanami, turned to intercept and closed in the darkness at 30 knots. The slower, less maneuverable Japanese destroyer rammed and crushed PT-109, commanded by Lt. John F. Kennedy.

Lt. Commander Gerard Roope, the captain of the G-class destroyer HMS Glowworm, posthumously won the Victoria Cross for the 1940 ramming of the German heavy cruiser Admiral Hipper following a close-range action in bad weather off the Norwegian coast. Recent claims suggest that Admiral Hipper was actually attempting to ram Glowworm and that the two ships simply collided.

During the so-called Cod Wars of 1958 to 1976 between Britain and Iceland, unarmed British fishing trawlers found themselves opposed by Icelandic Coast Guard vessels and converted trawlers. As well as Royal Navy coastguard vessels, Britain sent large, ocean-going tugs and frigate to protect its subjects, and numerous ramming incidents occurred against both sides, sometimes with very serious consequences. The whole Icelandic fleet of naval trawlers and at least 15 Royal Navy frigates suffered damage in the third conflict only (1975-1976).

In 1988 the Soviet Mirka II-class light frigate (FFL 824) and the Burevestnik-class frigate Bezzavetny (FFG 811) lightly rammed two US naval ships (the destroyer Caron and the cruiser Yorktown) inside contested Soviet territorial waters in the Black Sea, near the port of Foros. None of the ships involved suffered significant damage.

On 30 March 2020 the Venezuelan patrol-boat Naiguatá rammed the cruise ship RCGS Resolute after failing to damage it with a volley of gunfire. The Naiguatá was badly damaged from striking the strengthened hull of the Resolute, built to break ice, and sank shortly afterwards.

== Air warfare ==
Ramming in air combat is a last-ditch tactic that was used when all else had failed. The ramming pilot could use his entire aircraft as a ram or he could try to destroy the enemy's controls using the propeller or wing to chop into the enemy's tail or wing. Ramming took place when a pilot ran out of ammunition, yet was still eager to destroy an enemy, or when his plane had already been damaged beyond saving. Most ramming occurred when the attacker's aircraft was economically, strategically, or tactically less valuable than the enemy's, such as by pilots flying obsolescent aircraft against superior ones or by single-engine aircraft against multiple-engine bombers. Defenders rammed more often than invaders.

A ramming attack was not considered suicidal in the same manner as kamikaze attacks—the ramming pilot stands a chance of surviving, though it was very risky. Sometimes, the ramming aircraft itself could survive to make a controlled landing, though most were lost due to combat damage or the pilot bailing out. Ramming was used in air warfare in the first half of the 20th century, in both World Wars and in the interwar period. In the jet age, as air combat speeds increased, ramming occurred much less frequently—the probability of successfully executing (and surviving) a ramming attack approached zero.

== Ground warfare ==
In World War II, at least one incident of a tank ramming an enemy tank has been reported. In 1944, an Irish Guards Sherman rammed a Tiger II during Operation Goodwood. During the invasion of Iraq in 2003, in the course of the Battle of Nasiriyah, when Iraqi forces ambushed a stranded US Army logistic convoy, a Type-69 tank rammed and crushed a heavy tactical truck by traversing its gun on it.

== Siege warfare ==
In ancient and medieval conflicts, breaching of a fortification during sieges would commonly be attempted by repeated battering of an area of a wall or gate with a battering ram, a type of siege engine.

== Vehicle ramming attacks in terrorism and robberies ==
The FBI describes "vehicle ramming attacks—using modified or unmodified vehicles—against crowds, buildings, and other vehicles". Such attacks are often carried out by lone-wolf terrorists. Examples of ramming attacks as acts of terrorism include the September 11 attacks, the 2014 Jerusalem tractor attack, the 2006 UNC SUV attack, the 2008 Jerusalem bulldozer attack, and the 2008 Jerusalem vehicular attack.

Ram-raiding is sometimes used by criminals to breach shops to steal cash or merchandise.
