= Hegesippus =

Hegesippos (Ancient Greek: Ἡγήσιππος) or Latinized Hegesippus, may refer to:

- Hegesippus (orator), 4th century BC Greek politician and orator
- Hegesippus of Halicarnassus, naval commander during 306 BC campaign
- Hegesippus (chronicler), 2nd century early Church chronicler and saint

== See also ==
- Pseudo-Hegesippus, conventional title for a 4th-century adaptor of The Jewish War of Flavius Josephus
