= 2014 Jerusalem tractor attack =

Incident in the Israeli–Palestinian conflict

- The attack site
- Location: 31°47′23″N 35°13′32″E; Jerusalem
- Date: 4 August 2014; 12 years ago
- Attack type: Vehicular attack
- Deaths: 1 civilian (+1 attacker)
- Injuries: 7
- Assailant: Muhammed Naif El-Ja'abis

A terrorist ramming attack occurred on 4 August 2014 in Jerusalem, when a Palestinian drove an excavator out of a construction site, injuring several pedestrians and killing a civilian before ramming the tractor into a public bus, overturning the bus and then hitting it repeatedly. The terrorist was shot dead at the scene by two police officers while still seated at the wheel of the tractor and continuing to attack the bus by swinging the arm of the excavator against it.

The Jerusalem Post described it as part of a series of terrorist vehicular attacks in recent years.

== Attack and casualties ==
The attacker drove an excavator tractor out of a work site into a Shmuel HaNavi Street, a major street in central Jerusalem near the Olive Tree Hotel. He knocked down several pedestrians before ramming the public bus, which was empty except for the driver. One of the pedestrians, 30-year-old Avraham Waltz, was run over by the tractor and killed, while seven others were injured. After overturning the bus, the driver continued attacking by swinging the tractor's mechanical digging arm into the bus. Two police officers at the scene fired at and killed the attacker.

The attack echoed earlier terrorist vehicle ramming attacks in which vehicles were commandeered and used as weapons to run over pedestrians and attack other vehicles.

=== Police complaint over fake Haaretz article ===
Several days after the attack, the newspaper Haaretz filed a complaint with the police. While the headline about this attack published by Haaretz read "Soldier wounded in Jerusalem shooting, hours after digger attack kills one", a fake article pretending to be from Haaretz circulated on social media under a headline that read, "Bulldozer and bus in Jerusalem road accident". The fake article continued:

Mohammed Naif, 23, of Jabel Mukaber, lost control of the excavator, struck a pedestrian and collided with a bus. Police at the scene fired at the excavator, murdering Mohammed in cold blood. Police Commissioner Yohanan Danino supported the police officers' act, saying that they had acted according to the laws of apartheid that are the custom in Israel. A young Haredi man was killed when the construction vehicle struck him. Naif's family sent condolences to the family of the young man. Mohammed's mother told our reporter that recently Mohammed had suffered from fatigue due to overwork, and was saving money to fly to the Caribbean for a vacation, which had always been a dream of his.

The Haaretz police complaint alleged that, "The purpose of the article and those who circulated it was to mislead the public into thinking that this was the article Haaretz had published about the terror attack this week in which an Israeli man was killed in Jerusalem, in an effort to incite against the Haaretz newspaper and its owners, editors and writers". Authorities are investigating.

== Assailant ==
The police identified the assailant as Muhammed Naif El-Ja'abis, 23, from Jabel Mukaber, East Jerusalem. He was employed as an excavator operator at the scene of the attack. The police said that the attack was an act of terrorism. El-Ja'abis was already known to security officials before the attack.

== Impact ==
Video of the attack taken by a bystander was shown on international news media.

The attack took place following a month that had seen over 360 attacks on Jews, a spate that was thought by The Jerusalem Post to have "peaked" on 4 August 2014 with this attack and the shooting of a uniformed soldier in the French Hill neighborhood, leading to an increase in security in the city. It contributed to increasing tensions in the city. Israeli news channel Arutz Sheva framed the attack as part of a wave of violence incited by the Palestinian leadership, including an alleged declaration by senior Palestinian Authority official Jibril Rajoub that the PA had made a "political decision" to support "slaughtering" Jews living in East Jerusalem.

The Israeli daily Israel HaYom headlined coverage on the day following the attack, "the scenario the police and Shin Bet feared came true yesterday", referencing public fear of the ease with which vehicles can be turned into instruments of sudden terror attacks by ramming. The incident has been discussed in articles about the stress of living in Israel under constant threat of attack. As a violent incident mentioned in year-in-review articles. And as part of a wave of violence being called a Silent Intifada by some Israeli politicians and news media. A spate of attacks said to have "increased after the Jerusalem bulldozer attack in early August, in which a tractor driven by an Arab overturned a public bus, killing a father of five who was walking down the street at the time".

== See also ==
- 2006 UNC SUV attack
