= Battle of Salamis (306 BC) =

Naval battle during the Wars of the Diadochi

- Part of the Wars of the Diadochi
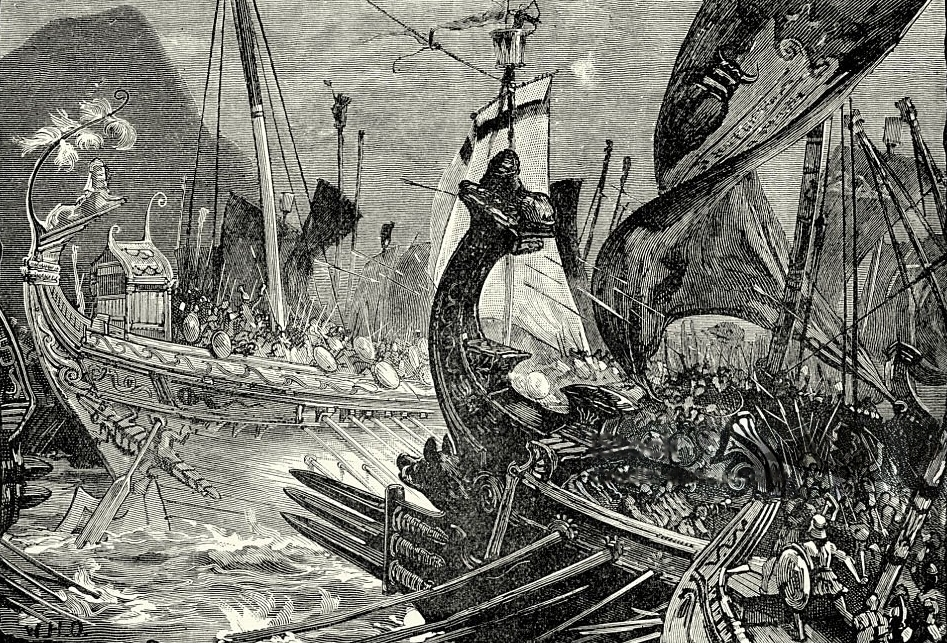
- 19th-century depiction of the battle between Ptolemy and Demetrius Poliorcetes off Salamis.
Date	306 BC
Location	Salamis, Cyprus 35°10′N 33°55′E
Result	Antigonid victory
Territorial changes	Capture of Cyprus by the Antigonids

Belligerents
Antigonids	Ptolemaics

Commanders and leaders
Demetrios; Medius	Ptolemaios; Menelaos (POW)

Strength
c. 180 warships (30 Athenian)	60 warships (Menelaus); 140 warships & 200 transports (Ptolemy)

Casualties and losses
20 warships damaged	80 warships lost 40 warships and 100 transports captured Menelaus' force surrenders
- Location of the naval battle of Salamis

The Battle of Salamis in 306 BC took place off Salamis, Cyprus between the fleets of Ptolemy I of Egypt and Antigonus I Monophthalmus, two of the Diadochi, the generals who, after the death of Alexander the Great, fought each other for control of his empire.

Cyprus had been seized by Ptolemy, and was used as a base for operations against the Antigonid territories in Asia Minor and the Levant. In 306 BC, Antigonus sent his son Demetrius to invade the island, which was defended by Ptolemy's brother Menelaus. After landing on the northeastern part of the island, Demetrius marched to Salamis, defeated Menelaus in a battle, and laid siege to the city. This was the first time where Demetrius demonstrated his flair for siege warfare, which would later earn him the sobriquet Poliorcetes, "the Besieger". Nevertheless, Menelaus held off Demetrius' attacks until the arrival of reinforcements. Ptolemy led a large-scale rescue expedition in person, hoping to catch Demetrius between his own forces and those of Menelaus, sallying forth from Salamis. Demetrius took a calculated risk by leaving only a small force to impede Menelaus, and focusing the bulk of his forces against Ptolemy. The ensuing battle was a complete victory for Demetrius, who destroyed or captured much of Ptolemy's fleet and army. After the battle, Menelaus and his men surrendered, and the rest of Cyprus was captured by Demetrius. In the wake of this victory, Antigonus assumed the royal title that had been vacant since the murder of Alexander's underage son. This act influenced the other Diadochi to follow and imitate Antigonus and Demetrius. Soon after the battle, most Diadochi officially assumed the kingship.

The battle was a turning point in the Diadochic Wars and placed the Antigonids in a position of supremacy in the emerging Hellenistic world. In addition, the adoption of the royal title had a lasting impact on the Hellenistic period.

== Background ==
During the Wars of the Diadochi that followed the death of Alexander the Great, Ptolemy I Soter, who had seized control of Egypt, had taken over the island of Cyprus and used it as a base of operations against his rival Antigonus I Monophthalmus. From Cyprus, Ptolemy's forces were able to raid the coasts of Syria and Asia Minor, territories controlled by Antigonus. In early 306 BC, Antigonus resolved to remove this threat, and ordered his son, Demetrius, to capture the island. Demetrius at the time was in Greece, where in the previous year he had overthrown the garrison installed in Athens by the ruler of Macedon, Cassander. The city, along with neighbouring Megara, was restored to democratic rule, and allied itself with Demetrius. As a result, when Demetrius sailed from Athens in the spring of 306 BC to capture Cyprus, he was accompanied by 30 Athenian quadriremes.

Crossing the Aegean, Demetrius made for the coast of Caria, whence he called upon the Rhodians to join him, per the terms of their alliance with his father. The Rhodians, however, who maintained good relations with Ptolemy, refused. Going on to Cilicia, where he was reinforced with more troops, Demetrius then crossed over to Cyprus with an army of 15,000 infantry and 500 cavalry. This was accompanied by a fleet numbering 53 heavy ships — 7 heptereis, 10 hexereis, 20 quinqueremes — and upwards of 110 lighter vessels—triremes and quadriremes — although the exact numbers are somewhat unclear. He was opposed by Ptolemy's brother, Menelaus, who disposed of 12,000 infantry, 800 cavalry, and 60 ships.

== Siege of Salamis and Ptolemy's arrival in Cyprus ==
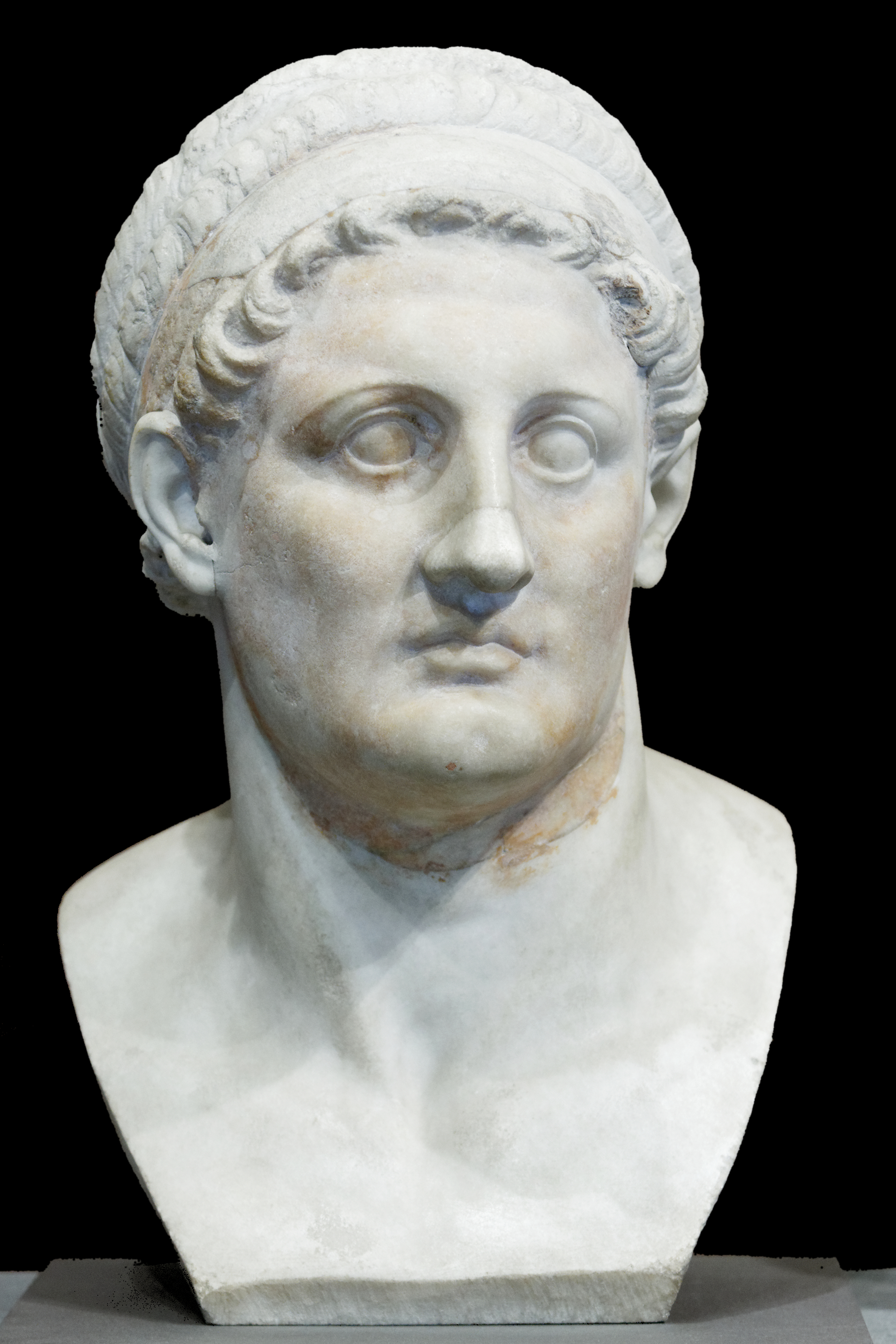
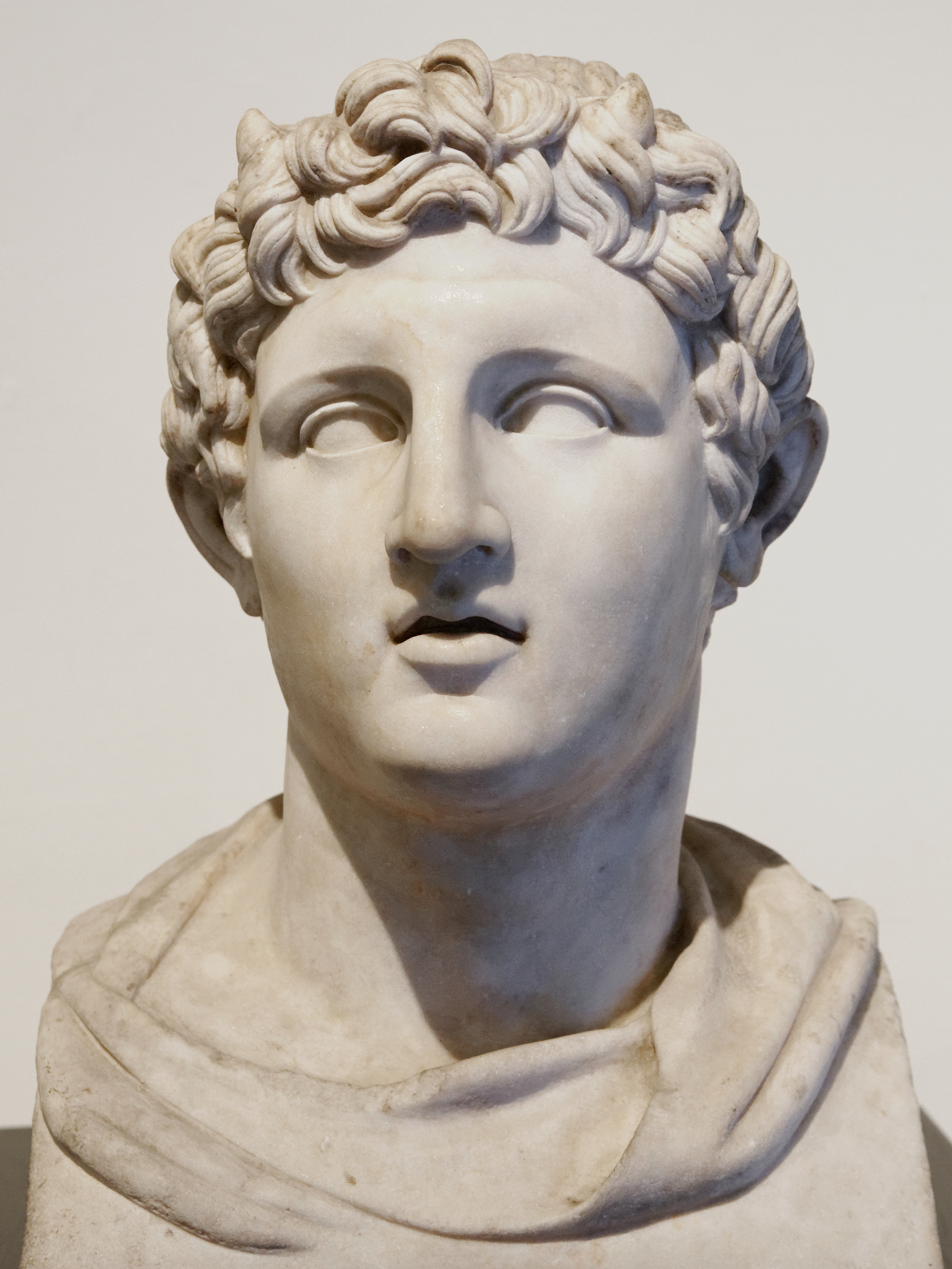
Marble busts of the two opposing commanders at Salamis, Ptolemy (left) and Demetrius (right)

Demetrius landed on the Karpas Peninsula on the northeast of the island and established a fortified encampment, protected by a palisade and a moat. From there he began raiding the area, and captured the towns of Karpasia and Urania. Leaving his fleet there, he then marched on land against the city of Salamis. Menelaus confronted Demetrius in battle some forty stadia (about 8.0 km (5 mi)) from the city, but his army of 12,000 infantry and 800 cavalry were defeated in a brief battle with heavy loss (1,000 dead and 3,000 captured according to Diodorus Siculus) and had to retreat behind its walls. Demetrius freed the captives and enrolled them in his army, but they soon tried to defect, so Demetrius sent them to his father in Syria instead.

Following the battle, Menelaus hastily made ready for a siege of Salamis, mounting catapults on the walls, and sent messengers to his brother for aid. Demetrius also began preparations for the first of the sieges that would earn Demetrius his nickname of "Poliorcetes" ("the Besieger"). Skilled craftsmen and large quantities of wood and iron were brought from Asia to begin constructing large siege engines, including two large battering rams encased in large canopies to protect them from missiles, and a massive, nine-level helepolis, equipped with catapults and ballistae on each level, operated by a crew of over 200 men. Demetrius then brought his fleet and siege train into action and assaulted the city. After a few days, Demetrius's machines breached the wall and his subsequent assault nearly proved decisive, and was only stopped by nightfall. During the night, Menelaus gathered flammable material and set the largest siege engines on fire.

In the meantime, in response to his brother's appeals, Ptolemy himself had sailed from Alexandria at the head of his fleet. He arrived at Nea Paphos, on the western coast of Cyprus, at the head of 140 warships, (Note: This number is given by Diodorus Siculus (20.49.2) as well as Polyaenus (Stratagems in War, 4.7.7), while Plutarch (Demetrius, 16.1) mentions 150 warships.) all quadriremes and quinqueremes, and of over 10,000 men on 200 transports. According to Plutarch, Ptolemy issued an ultimatum to Demetrius to leave Cyprus, while the latter countered with the offer that he would do so, if Ptolemy were to withdraw his garrisons from the cities of Sicyon and Corinth in Greece.

Ptolemy decided to try to make a night dash from Kition, round Cape Greco, to Salamis, hoping to surprise Demetrius and combine his fleet with his brother’s sixty ships so they could then outnumber Demetrius. Demetrius, however, informed of Ptolemy's arrival, took steps to prevent this from happening; he equipped his ships with missile-throwers, brought aboard his best troops as marines, and sailed his fleet to anchor just outside the harbour of the city, bottling up Menelaus in the harbour and interposing himself between the two enemy fleets. This meant that Demetrius took a calculated risk that he would be able to defeat Ptolemy before Menelaus could sail out of the harbour and attack him in the rear.

== Naval combat before Salamis ==
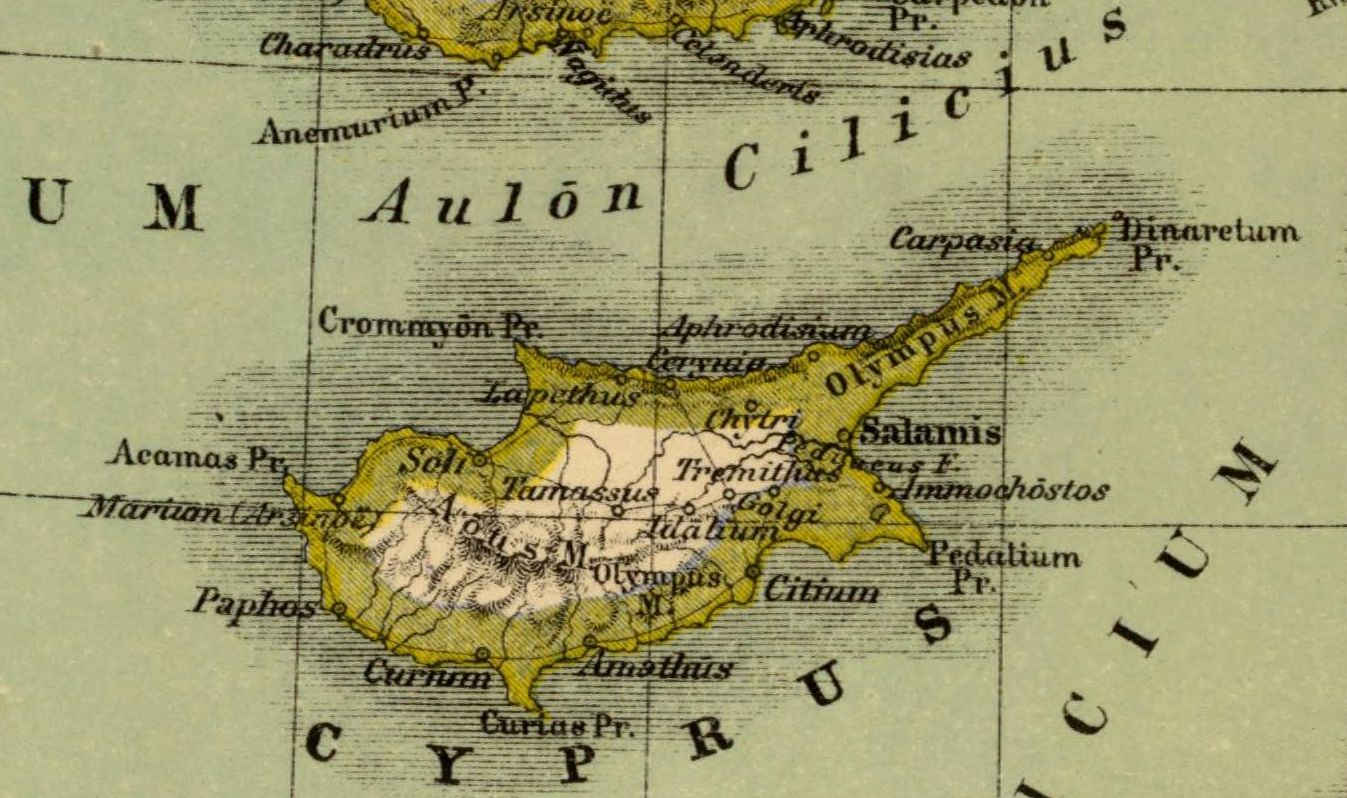
Map of ancient Cyprus.

As Ptolemy's fleet came into view of the city right after dawn on the day of the battle, they found Demetrius's fleet deployed and waiting for them. His fleet augmented to some 180 vessels with ships captured in Cyprus, Demetrius concentrated the bulk against Ptolemy, leaving only 10 quinqueremes under Antisthenes to blockade the narrow exit of the harbour of Salamis and prevent, or at least delay, Menelaus's intervention. Demetrius had gathered his best ships—the seven Phoenician heptereis, the Athenian squadron, and behind them 10 hexereis and 10 quinqueremes—on the left, under command of the admiral Medius of Larissa. Medius was apparently the actual overall commander of the fleet, although Demetrius was also present on the left wing on his flagship, a hepteres. His centre comprised the lightest vessels in his fleet, under the command of Themison of Samos and Marsyas of Pella, while the right was entrusted to Hegesippus of Halicarnassus and Pleistias of Cos, the chief pilot (archikybernetes, the second-in-command after Medius) of the fleet. Ptolemy quickly matched his fleet to mirror his opponent's dispositions; he ordered the transports carrying his army to fall back, and massed the largest ships of his fleet on his own left, which he commanded in person. As the historian Richard Billows writes, "the battle was in effect a race to see which of the two dynasts could first defeat the enemy's right wing and turn to attack the enemy's center", with the "added question of whether or not Menelaus would succeed in breaking out of Salamis in time to intervene".

According to Diodorus Siculus, who provides the fullest, and probably most reliable, account of the battle, when the two fleets were about three stadia apart, both Demetrius and Ptolemy raised the signal to attack (a gilded shield), and the two fleets charged each other. Diodorus describes the ramming and boarding actions, as well as the missile exchanges, that dominated the fight:

[U]sing their bows and their ballistae at first, then their javelins in a shower, the men wounded those who were within range; then when the ships had come close together and the encounter was about to take place with violence, the soldiers on the decks crouched down and the oarsmen, spurred on by the signalmen, bent more desperately to their oars. As the ships drove together with force and violence, in some cases they swept off each other's oars so that the ships became useless for flight or pursuit, and the men who were on board, though eager for a fight, were prevented from joining in the battle; but where the ships had met prow to prow with their rams, they drew back for another charge, and the soldiers on board shot at each other with effect since the mark was close at hand for each party. Some of the men, when their captains had delivered a broadside blow and the rams had become firmly fixed, leaped aboard the ships of the enemy, receiving and giving severe wounds; for certain of them, after grasping the rail of a ship that was drawing near, missed their footing, fell into the sea, and at once were killed with spears by those who stood above them; and others, making good their intent, slew some of the enemy and, forcing others along the narrow deck, drove them into the sea. As a whole the fighting was varied and full of surprises: many times those who were weaker got the upper hand because of the height of their ships, and those who were stronger were foiled by inferiority of position and by the irregularity with which things happen in fighting of this kind.

— Diodorus Siculus, The Library of History,

Demetrius won distinction for his bravery when Ptolemy's men boarded his flagship, "by hurling his javelins at some of them and by striking others at close range with his spear", despite being subject to "many missiles of all sorts". Of his three bodyguards, who tried to protect him with their shields, one was killed and the others severely wounded. The Athenians also fought with distinction, as Demetrius awarded 1,200 suits of armour to Athens from the spoils taken. In the end, both left wings proved victorious, but it was Demetrius who won the race: by the time Ptolemy turned to attack Demetrius's centre, he found the rest of his fleet already defeated and in flight. Menelaus' 60 ships meanwhile, under the command of Menoetius, broke through Demetrius's blockade, only to find the battle already lost.

== Aftermath of the battle ==
Demetrius tasked Neon and Burichus with pursuing the defeated enemy and picking up the men from the sea, and returned in triumph to his camp. According to Diodorus, only 20 of his ships had been damaged, all of which returned to service after repairs, while Ptolemy's fleet had lost 80 ships. More importantly, Demetrius's forces had captured 40 of Ptolemy's warships intact with their crews, as well as over a hundred of the transports with some 8,000 troops aboard. Plutarch goes further, claiming that Ptolemy saved only eight of his ships, and that 70 of Ptolemy's ships were captured. Among the numerous prisoners taken by Demetrius was the courtesan Lamia of Athens, who later became the mistress of Demetrius, as well as Leontiscus, one of Ptolemy's sons. Demetrius sent his flagship to Syria with Aristodemus of Miletus to report the victory to Antigonus.

Following his defeat, Ptolemy retreated to Egypt, and Menelaus was forced to surrender Salamis and its garrison, further increasing Demetrius's strength. Demetrius then moved to take over the rest of Cyprus, taking over the garrisons into his own army as well. According to Diodorus, the total strength added to his forces were 16,000 infantry and 800 cavalry. Despite their rivalry, the relationship between Ptolemy and Demetrius was characterized by a mutual respect and chivalrous conduct; after the Ptolemaic victory at Gaza in the spring of 312 BC Ptolemy had unconditionally released the captives and baggage train of Demetrius, a gesture reciprocated by Demetrius after his success at Myus in the next year. Demetrius honoured this after Salamis as well, immediately releasing Menelaus and other relatives and friends of Ptolemy who had been captured with their personal possessions. When Ptolemy recaptured Cyprus in 295 BC, and found Demetrius's mother and children at Salamis, he again reciprocated by immediately releasing them.

== Impact ==
The victory at Salamis was used by Antigonus as a suitable pretext for his own proclamation as king (basileus), the Macedonian throne having lain vacant since the murder of Alexander IV of Macedon by Cassander in 309 BC. At the same time, Demetrius was raised to co-king alongside his father. Antigonus's assumption of the royal title was followed by an attempt to eliminate Ptolemy for good in a massive, but failed, invasion of Egypt in the autumn of 306, and then by the celebrated, but equally unsuccessful, Siege of Rhodes by Demetrius in 305–304 BC. Finally, in 302 BC the remaining dynasts—Ptolemy, Cassander, Seleucus, and Lysimachus—having in turn assumed the royal title themselves, allied against Antigonus and defeated him in the Battle of Ipsus in 301 BC. Antigonus was killed, and his realm was broken up and divided among the victors. Demetrius survived the battle, and thanks to his large fleet managed to maintain control of a coastal and insular realm encompassing Cyprus, the Cyclades, Sidon, Tyre, Corinth, and the major cities of western Asia Minor. During the next years, Cyprus became a base of operations for Demetrius in the Levant, and for his imposition of control over Athens and southern Greece. However, in 295 BC, during his absence in Greece, Ptolemy seized Cyprus.

The Battle of Salamis is proposed by modern scholars as one of three possible naval battles—along with the Battle of Amorgos (322 BC) and the Battle of Cos (261/255 BC)—that provided the occasion for the erection of the statue of the Nike of Samothrace.

== Sources ==
- Billows, Richard A. (1990). Antigonos the One-Eyed and the Creation of the Hellenistic State. Berkeley and Los Angeles, California: University of California Press. ISBN 0-520-20880-3.
- Diodorus Siculus (1954). The Library of History. Loeb Classical Library 390. Translated by Russel M. Geer. Cambridge, Massachusetts: Harvard University Press. ISBN 978-0-674994294.
- Murray, William (2012). The Age of Titans, the Rise and Fall of the Great Hellenistic Navies. Oxford and New York: Oxford University Press. ISBN 978-0-19-538864-0.
- Plutarch (1920). Lives, Volume IX: Demetrius and Antony, Pyrrhus and Gaius Marius. Loeb Classical Library L101. Translated by Bernadotte Perrin. Cambridge, Massachusetts: Harvard University Press. ISBN 978-0-674991125.
