= Themison =

Themison (Ancient Greek: Θεμίσων) may refer to:

- Themison of Eretria, 4th-century BC tyrant of Eretria
- Themison of Laodicea, 1st-century BC Greek physician
- Themison of Samos, 4th-century BC admiral
- Themison of Thera, merchant ordered by King Etearchus to throw the latter's daughter into the sea, but rescued her instead
- Themison of Cyprus, king of Keryneia
