= Lamia of Athens =

Hetaera, active c. 300 BC

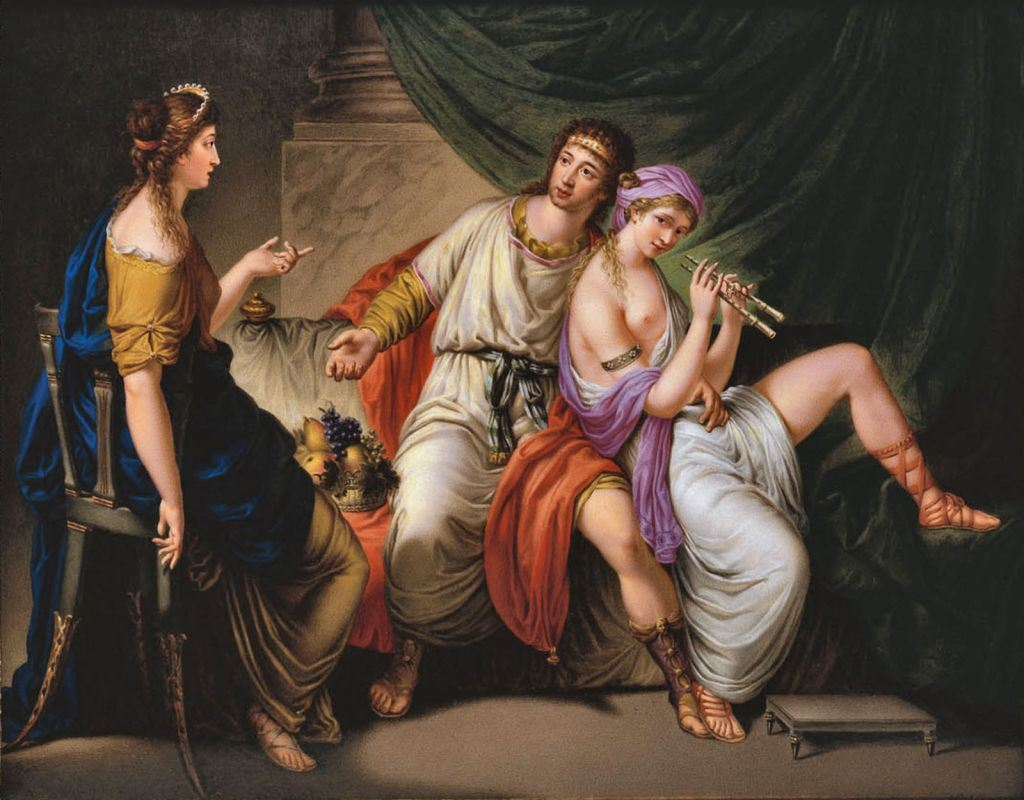
Franz Caucig: Demetrius Poliorcetes with the Flautist Lamia and Her Friend Demo (c. 1800)

Lamia of Athens (Greek: Λαμία; fl. 300 BC) was a celebrated musician and hetaira, and mistress of Demetrius Poliorcetes.

== Life ==
Lamia was the daughter of one Cleanor. She began her career as a flute-player on the stage, for which she gained some fame, but afterwards abandoned it for life as a hetaira.

It is not known how she found herself on board of the fleet of Ptolemy I at the naval battle of Salamis in Cyprus (306 BC), but it was on that occasion that she fell into the hands of the young Demetrius Poliorcetes. Though then already past her prime, she captivated the young prince, and her sway continued unbroken for many years, notwithstanding her numerous rivals. She owed her influence, it was said, to her wit and talent, and these were celebrated by the comic writers as well as the historians of the period, and many anecdotes concerning her have been preserved by Plutarch and Athenaeus.

The excess and magnificence of the banquets which she gave to Demetrius are much discussed. However, she is recorded to have used the treasures which were lavished upon her by building a splendid portico for the citizens of Sicyon, probably at the time when Sicyon was largely rebuilt by Demetrius. The Athenians, in order to please Demetrius, consecrated a temple in honour of Lamia, under the title of Aphrodite, and their example was followed by the Thebans. According to Athenaeus, she had a daughter by Demetrius, who received the name of Phila.

Diogenes Laertius (v. 76) mentions that Demetrius of Phalerum also cohabited with a woman named Lamia, whom he calls an Athenian of noble birth. That Lamia is presumably a different person, if the story is not an error.
