= On the Halonnesus =

Speech ascribed to Demosthenes

"On the Halonnesus" (Ancient Greek: Περὶ τῆς Ἀλοννήσου) is a political oration attributed to the prominent Athenian statesman and orator Demosthenes.

The speech constitutes an Athenian response to a letter of Philip II of Macedon, with which the King of Macedon proposed the amendment of the most important term of the Peace of Philocrates ("each side should keep the territory possessed at the moment of the official conclusion of the peace treaty"). In exchange he offered to the Athenians the island of Halonnesus. The orator rejects Philip's demands and proposes instead the mediation of arbitrator, in order to settle their differences. Libanius, who wrote 57 hypotheses or introductions to Demosthenes' orations predicates that On the Halonnesus does not belong to Demosthenes, but to Hegesippus, another prominent member of the anti-Macedonian faction. A. Galinos supports Libanius' position, pointing that this speech differs in terms of style and argumentation from the other orations of Demosthenes.
