= Medius of Larissa =

Thessalian military commander

Medius or Medeios (Greek: Μήδιος, Mήδειoς), son of Oxythemis, was a native of Larissa in Thessaly, an officer and friend of Alexander the Great, and a senior commander under Antigonus I Monophthalmus.

== Origin and service under Alexander ==
Medius belonged to a noble Thessalian family, possibly related to the Aleuadae clan. According to Diodorus Siculus (Library of History, XIV.82), his namesake grandfather was a dynast in Larissa in 395. He is first mentioned as commanding a trireme during the descent of the Indus River (Arrian, Indica, 18) in 326 BC, but according to the historian Richard Billows it is likely that he was a member of Alexander the Great's expedition into Asia from the beginning, possibly within the ranks of the Thessalian cavalry. He enjoyed a high place in the personal favor of Alexander, becoming one of his hetairoi and most prominent courtiers during the Macedonian monarch's last days: he hosted the banquet where Alexander supped just before his final illness. Plutarch (Moralia, 65) accuses him of being among the shameless flatterers who drove Alexander to some of his most reprehensible actions. In later literature, e.g. the Alexander romance, he was considered a member of Antipater's conspiracy to poison Alexander, which took place during the banquet hosted at his house.

== Service under Antigonus ==
After the death of Alexander, he served under Perdiccas, who in 320 BC sent him as commander of the mercenaries in Aristonous of Pella's expedition to Cyprus. He subsequently appears in the service of Antigonus Monophthalmus, perhaps being captured when Cyprus was taken over by Antigonus shortly after. In late 313 BC, he commanded a fleet summoned by Antigonus from Phoenicia to Caria. On the way he defeated and took thirty-six ships of the Pydnaeans, who had espoused the party of Cassander (Diodorus, XIX.69). According to the historian Hans Hauben, Medius was probably appointed by Antigonus as the chief admiral of his fleet, a post he kept at least until 304 BC. In 312 BC he took Miletus, and afterwards relieved the city of Oreus in Euboea, which was besieged by Cassander himself (Diodorus, XIX.75). In the same year he was dispatched by Antigonus with a fleet of 150 ships, to make a descent in Greece, and landed a large army in Boeotia under Ptolemy; after which he returned to Asia to co-operate with Antigonus himself at the Hellespont (Diodorus, XIX.77). Based on an inscription in Athens, in c. 307/6 BC he provided assistance to the Athenian embassy to Antigonus' court.

In 306 BC, he commanded the fleet in Demetrius Poliorcetes' expedition to Cyprus, and led the crucial eastern flank of the Antigonid fleet in the great sea-fight off Salamis against Ptolemy of Egypt (Diodorus, XX.50), which ended in a major victory for the Antigonid forces. It appears also that he accompanied Antigonus on his unsuccessful expedition against Ptolemaic Egypt in the same year. In 304 BC he was active in Greece alongside Demetrius. His fate thereafter is unknown, but he is mentioned again in an inscription in Gonnoi in Thessaly, probably dating to the period when Demetrius was king of Macedonia, implying that Medius continued to serve Demetrius even after the defeat and death of Antigonus at the Battle of Ipsus in 301 BC.

His authority is cited by Strabo (XI.530) in a manner that would lead us to conclude he had left some historical work, but we find no further mention of him as a writer.

== See also ==
- Ariston of Pharsalus

== Sources ==
- Billows, Richard A. (1990). Antigonos the One-Eyed and the Creation of the Hellenistic State. Berkeley and Los Angeles, California: University of California Press. ISBN 0-520-20880-3.
