= Burichus =

Burichus (Ancient Greek: Βούριχος) was one of Demetrius I Poliorcetes' commanders in the naval Battle of Salamis (306 BC) at Cyprus. After the battle, Neon and Burichus were tasked by Demetrius to pursue the defeated enemy and pick up the men from the sea. The Athenians built an altar and a heroum in his honour.
