= Greek destroyer Pindos =

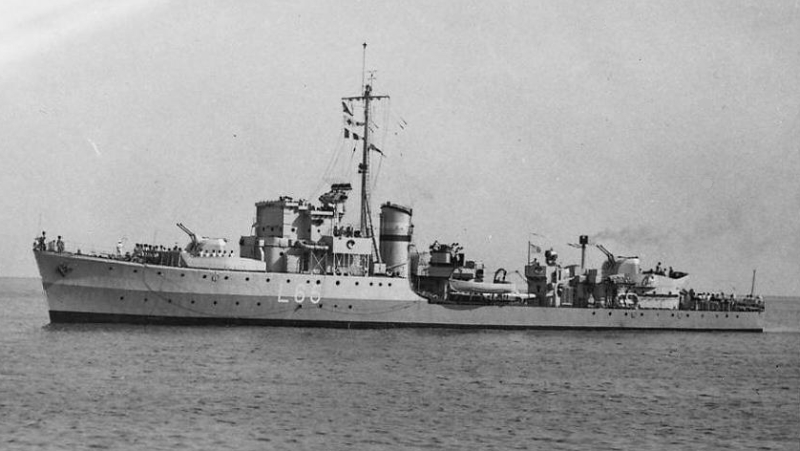
- Pindos - ΒΠ Πίνδος (L65)

History

United Kingdom
- Name: Bolebroke
- Builder: Swan Hunter, Tyne and Wear, United Kingdom
- Laid down: 3 April 1941
- Launched: 5 November 1941

Greece
- Name: Pindos - ΒΠ Πίνδος
- Namesake: Battle of Pindus
- Commissioned: 27 June 1942
- Decommissioned: 1959
- Identification: Pennant number:L65
- Fate: Returned to UK and sold for scrap in 1960

General characteristics
- Class & type: Type III Hunt-class destroyer
- Displacement: Full load 1,490 tons; Standard 1,050 tons
- Length: 85.3 m (280 ft)
- Beam: 11.4 m (37 ft)
- Draft: 2.4 m (7 ft 10 in)
- Propulsion: Boilers: 2 Admiralty 3 drum boilers, Engines: 2 shaft Parsons turbine, Shafts: 2 (twin screw ship), Power: 19,000 shp, (14.2 MW)
- Speed: 26-knot (48 km/h) maximum; 20-knot (37 km/h) maximum operational
- Range: 2,350 nautical miles (4,350 km) at 20.0 knots (37 km/h)
- Complement: 170
- Armament: 4 × 4-inch (102 mm) (2 × 2) guns, one 4 × 40 mm A/A QF 2-pounder pompom gun, 3 × 20 mm A/A, 2 × 21-inch (533 mm) T/T, one depth charge track

Pindos (Greek: ΒΠ Πίνδος) was a Type III Hunt-class destroyer that was originally built for the British Royal Navy as HMS Bolebroke but never commissioned. Before her completion, she was transferred to the Royal Hellenic Navy and commissioned on 27 June 1942 as Pindos in order to relieve heavy losses of ships sustained by the Royal Hellenic Navy during the German invasion of 1941. Pindos served in the Mediterranean Theatre throughout the Second World War. On 22 August 1943, along with HMS Easton, she sank the German U-boat U-458 off Pantelleria. Konstantinos Engolfopoulos served as executive officer during this period.

The crew of the Pindos were involved in the 1944 Greek naval mutiny. They elected a Revolutionary Commission and circulated a petition demanding that the Greek government-in-exile be expanded to include members of the Revolutionary committee of the National Liberation Front (EAM).

Pindos served during the Greek Civil War, was returned to the Royal Navy in 1959 and broken up for scrap in Greece in 1960.
