= Ariston of Pharsalus =

Thessalian hetairos of Alexander the Great

Ariston of Pharsalus was a Thessalian hetairos of Alexander the Great and a friend of Medius of Larissa, whose dinner party he attended on 16 Daisios May 323.
