= Hegesippus of Halicarnassus =

Hegesippus of Halicarnassus (Ancient Greek: Ἡγήσιππος Ἁλικαρνασσεύς) was a naval commander in the service of Antigonus Monophthalmus.

He is first only mentioned by Diodorus Siculus (Library of History, XX.50) during Demetrius Poliorcetes' expedition to Cyprus in 306 BC. Along with Pleistias of Cos, he led the right wing of the Antigonid fleet in the great sea-fight off Salamis against Ptolemy of Egypt. Although the Antigonid right wing was defeated by the opposite left, led by Ptolemy himself, the Antigonid left also broke through and enveloped the Ptolemaic centre, securing a major victory for the Antigonid forces.

== Sources ==
- Billows, Richard A. (1990). Antigonos the One-Eyed and the Creation of the Hellenistic State. Berkeley and Los Angeles, California: University of California Press. ISBN 0-520-20880-3.
