= Themison of Samos =

Themison of Samos (Greek: Θεμίσων) was a naval commander in the service of Antigonus Monophthalmus.

He is first mentioned by Diodorus Siculus (Library of History, XIX.62) as bringing a fleet of 40 ships to Antigonus, who was besieging Tyre, from the Hellespont. He is next mentioned as participating in Demetrius Poliorcetes' expedition to Cyprus in 306 BC, and led the light vessels in the centre of the Antigonid fleet in the great sea-fight off Salamis against Ptolemy of Egypt (Diodorus, XX.50), which ended in a major victory for the Antigonid forces.

== Sources ==
- Billows, Richard A. (1990). Antigonos the One-Eyed and the Creation of the Hellenistic State. Berkeley and Los Angeles, California: University of California Press. ISBN 0-520-20880-3.
