= German submarine U-458 =

German World War II submarine

History

Nazi Germany
- Name: U-458
- Ordered: 16 January 1940
- Builder: Deutsche Werke AG, Kiel
- Yard number: 289
- Laid down: 16 October 1940
- Launched: 4 October 1941
- Commissioned: 12 December 1941
- Fate: Sunk on 22 August 1943

General characteristics
- Class & type: Type VIIC submarine
- Displacement: 769 tonnes (757 long tons) surfaced; 871 t (857 long tons) submerged
- Length: 67.10 m (220 ft 2 in) o/a; 50.50 m (165 ft 8 in) pressure hull
- Beam: 6.20 m (20 ft 4 in) o/a; 4.70 m (15 ft 5 in) pressure hull
- Draught: 4.74 m (15 ft 7 in)
- Installed power: 2,800–3,200 PS (2,100–2,400 kW; 2,800–3,200 bhp) (diesels); 750 PS (550 kW; 740 shp) (electric)
- Propulsion: 2 shafts; 2 × diesel engines; 2 × electric motors
- Speed: 17.7 knots (32.8 km/h; 20.4 mph) surfaced; 7.6 knots (14.1 km/h; 8.7 mph) submerged
- Range: 8,500 nmi (15,700 km; 9,800 mi) at 10 knots (19 km/h; 12 mph) surfaced; 80 nmi (150 km; 92 mi) at 4 knots (7.4 km/h; 4.6 mph) submerged
- Test depth: 230 m (750 ft); Crush depth: 250–295 m (820–968 ft)
- Complement: 4 officers, 40–56 enlisted
- Armament: 5 × 53.3 cm (21 in) torpedo tubes (four bow, one stern); 14 × torpedoes; 1 × 8.8 cm (3.46 in) deck gun (220 rounds); 1 x 2 cm (0.79 in) C/30 AA gun

Service record
- Part of: 8th U-boat Flotilla; 12 December 1941 – 30 June 1942; 3rd U-boat Flotilla; 1 July – 31 October 1942; 29th U-boat Flotilla; 1 November 1942 – 22 August 1943
- Identification codes: M 42 437
- Commanders: Oblt.z.S. / Kptlt. Kurt Diggins; 12 December 1941 – 22 August 1943
- Operations: 7 patrols: 1st patrol: 21 June – 27 August 1942; 2nd patrol: 1 – 15 October 1942; 3rd patrol: 26 October – 15 November 1942; 4th patrol: a. 6 February – 11 March 1943; b. 19 May 1943; 5th patrol: 25 – 31 May 1943; 6th patrol: 21 June - 6 July 1943; 7th patrol: 14 – 22 August 1943
- Victories: 2 merchant ships sunk (7,584 GRT)

German submarine U-458 was a Type VIIC U-boat built for Nazi Germany's Kriegsmarine for service during World War II. She was laid down on 16 October 1940 by Deutsche Werke AG, Kiel as yard number 289, launched on 4 October 1941 and commissioned on 12 December 1941 under Oberleutnant zur See Kurt Diggins.

== Design ==
German Type VIIC submarines were preceded by the shorter Type VIIB submarines. U-458 had a displacement of 769 tonnes (757 long tons) when at the surface and 871 tonnes (857 long tons) while submerged. She had a total length of 67.10 m (220 ft 2 in), a pressure hull length of 50.50 m (165 ft 8 in), a beam of 6.20 m (20 ft 4 in), a height of 9.60 m (31 ft 6 in), and a draught of 4.74 m (15 ft 7 in). The submarine was powered by two Germaniawerft F46 four-stroke, six-cylinder supercharged diesel engines producing a total of 2,800 to 3,200 metric horsepower (2,060 to 2,350 kW; 2,760 to 3,160 shp) for use while surfaced, two Siemens-Schuckert GU 343/38–8 double-acting electric motors producing a total of 750 metric horsepower (550 kW; 740 shp) for use while submerged. She had two shafts and two 1.23 m (4 ft) propellers. The boat was capable of operating at depths of up to 230 metres (750 ft).

The submarine had a maximum surface speed of 17.7 knots (32.8 km/h; 20.4 mph) and a maximum submerged speed of 7.6 knots (14.1 km/h; 8.7 mph). When submerged, the boat could operate for 80 nautical miles (150 km; 92 mi) at 4 knots (7.4 km/h; 4.6 mph); when surfaced, she could travel 8,500 nautical miles (15,700 km; 9,800 mi) at 10 knots (19 km/h; 12 mph). U-458 was fitted with five 53.3 cm (21 in) torpedo tubes (four fitted at the bow and one at the stern), fourteen torpedoes, one 8.8 cm (3.46 in) SK C/35 naval gun, 220 rounds, and a 2 cm (0.79 in) C/30 anti-aircraft gun. The boat had a complement of between forty-four and sixty.

== Service history ==
The boat's career began with training at 8th U-boat Flotilla on 12 December 1941, followed by active service on 1 July 1942 as part of the 3rd Flotilla where she stayed for only four months, before transferring to Mediterranean operations with 29th Flotilla on 1 November 1942.

In 7 patrols she sank two merchant ships, for a total of 7,584 gross register tons (GRT).

=== Wolfpacks ===
U-458 took part in one wolfpack, namely:

- Tümmler (1 – 11 October 1942)

=== Fate ===
U-458 was sunk on 22 August 1943 in the Mediterranean Sea in position 36°25′N 12°39′E, by depth charges from HMS Easton and the Greek destroyer Pindos. There were 8 dead and 39 survivors.

== Summary of raiding history ==
Date	Ship Name	Nationality	Tonnage (GRT)	Fate
30 June 1942	Mosfruit	Norway	2,714	Sunk
5 August 1942	Arletta	United Kingdom	4,870	Sunk

== See also ==
- Mediterranean U-boat Campaign (World War II)

== Bibliography ==
- Busch, Rainer; Röll, Hans-Joachim (1999). German U-boat commanders of World War II : a biographical dictionary. Translated by Brooks, Geoffrey. London, Annapolis, Md: Greenhill Books, Naval Institute Press. ISBN 1-55750-186-6.
- Busch, Rainer; Röll, Hans-Joachim (1999). Deutsche U-Boot-Verluste von September 1939 bis Mai 1945 [German U-boat losses from September 1939 to May 1945]. Der U-Boot-Krieg (in German). Vol. IV. Hamburg, Berlin, Bonn: Mittler. ISBN 3-8132-0514-2.
- Gröner, Erich; Jung, Dieter; Maass, Martin (1991). U-boats and Mine Warfare Vessels. German Warships 1815–1945. Vol. 2. Translated by Thomas, Keith; Magowan, Rachel. London: Conway Maritime Press. ISBN 0-85177-593-4.
- Sharpe, Peter (1998). U-Boat Fact File. Great Britain: Midland Publishing. ISBN 1-85780-072-9.
