= Hegesippus (orator) =

Hegesippus was a statesman and orator, nicknamed "knot", probably from the way in which he wore his hair. He lived in the time of Demosthenes, whose anti-Macedonian policy he enthusiastically supported. In 343 BC, he was one of the ambassadors sent to Macedonia to discuss, amongst other matters, the restoration of the island of Halonnesus, which had been seized by king Philip of Macedonia. The mission was unsuccessful, but soon afterwards Philip wrote to Athens, offering to resign possession of the island or to submit to arbitration the question of ownership. In reply to this letter the oration De Halonneso was delivered, which, although included among the speeches of Demosthenes, is generally considered to be by Hegesippus. Dionysius of Halicarnassus and Plutarch, however, favour the authorship of Demosthenes.

The Middle Comedy poet Crobylus is sometimes "confounded" with Hegesippus.

== Sources ==
- This work in turn cites:
  - Demosthenes: De falsa legatione, pp. 364, 447; De corona p. 250; Philippica, iii, p. 129.
  - Plutarch: Demosthenes, p. 17; Apophthegmata, p. 187D
  - Dionysius Halicarnassus. ad Ammaeum, i.
  - Grote. History of Greece, ch. 90.
- Smith, William. Dictionary of Greek and Roman Biography and Mythology, 1870, London. p. 896.
