= 5-ton 6×6 truck =

Class of six-wheel drive trucks

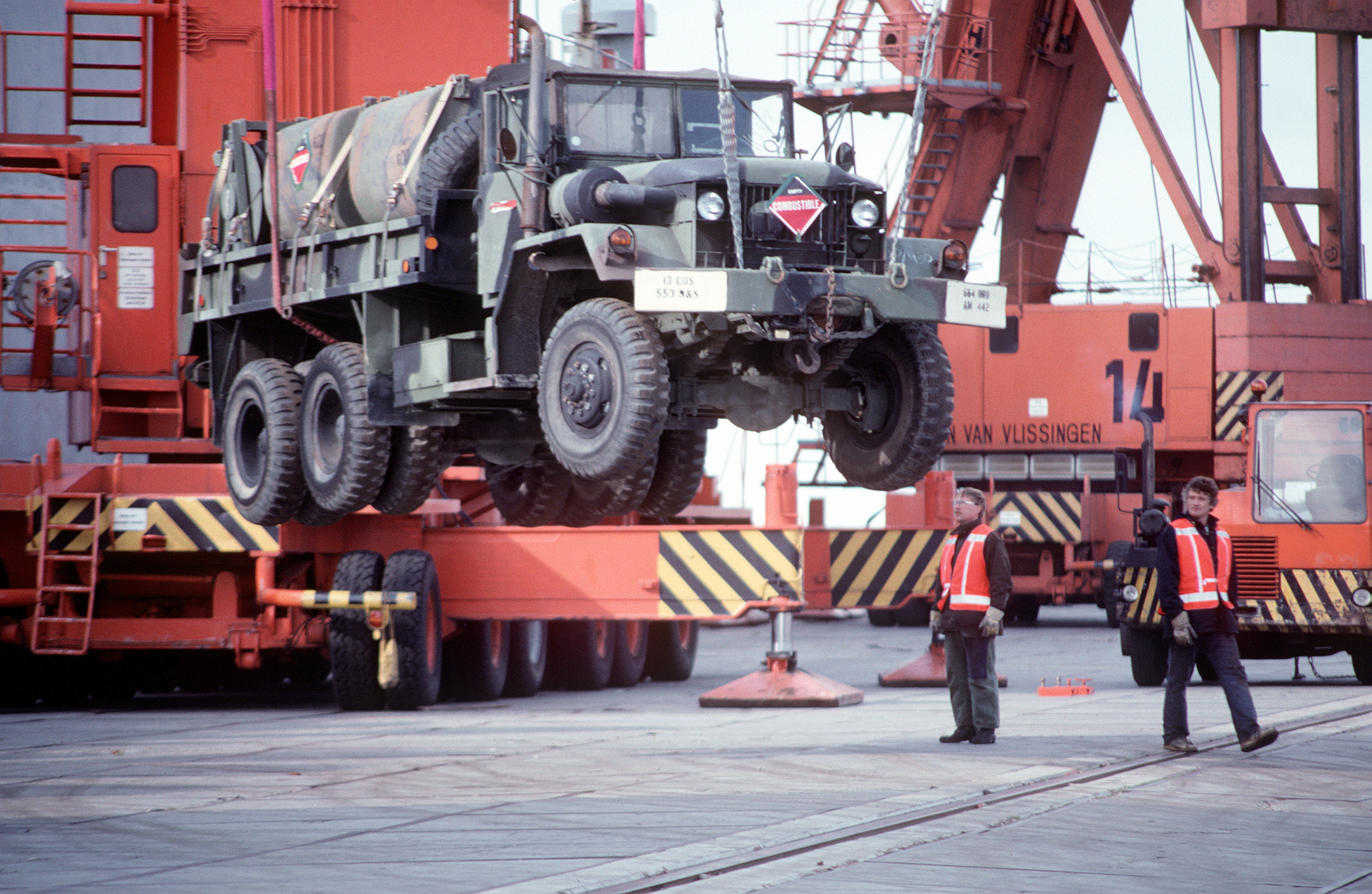
M54 (M39 series)

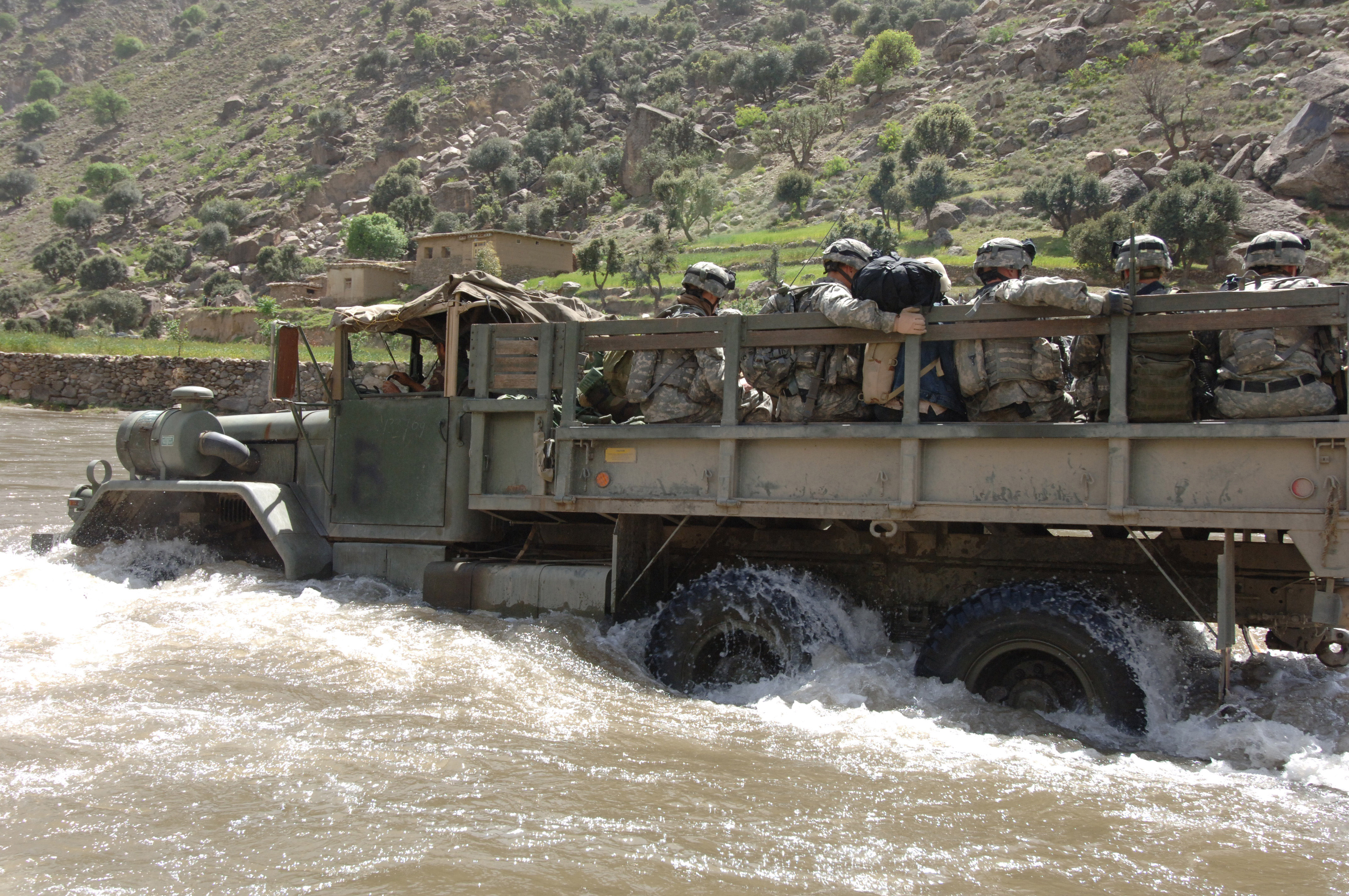
M813 (M809 series)

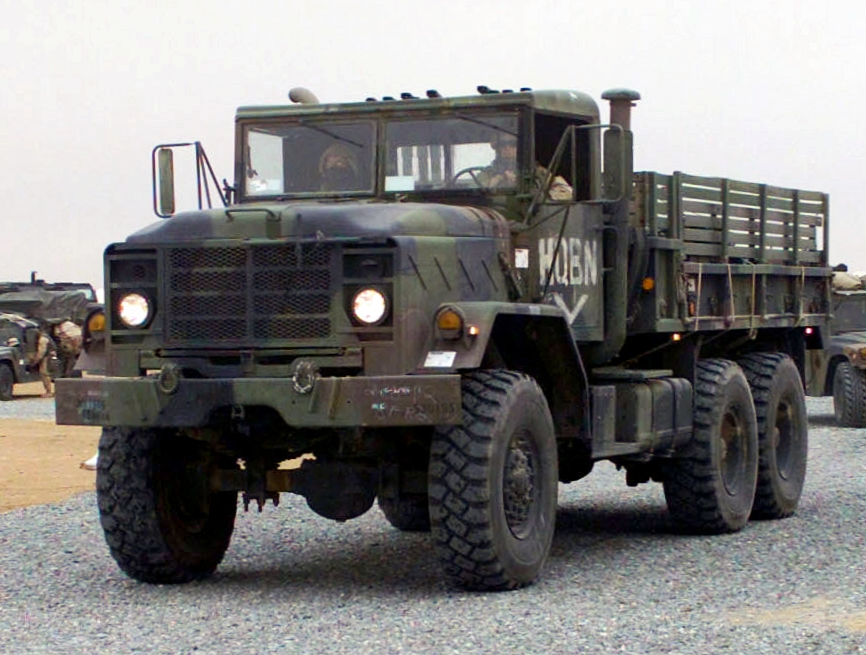
M923 (M939 series)

The 5‑ton 6x6 truck, officially "Truck, 5-ton, 6x6", was a class of heavy-duty six-wheel drive trucks used by the US Armed Forces. The basic cargo version was designed to transport a 5-ton (4,500 kg) load over all roads and cross-country terrain in all weather. Through three evolutionary series (M39, M809, and M939) there have been component improvements, but all trucks were mechanically very similar. They were the standard heavy-duty truck of the US military for 40 years, until replaced by the Medium Tactical Vehicle (MTV) beginning in 1991.

== History ==
A 20 June 1945 report by the Army Ground Forces Equipment Review Board recommended that all 4‑ton to 6‑ton tactical trucks should be replaced by a single standard 5‑ton (4,536 kg) 6x6 truck series. In 1949 specifications were set and truck manufactures began working on prototypes. Chrysler, GMC, and Mack's designs were advanced, International Harvester's was a conservative conventional, similar in size and layout to the earlier 6-ton (G512) series.

The International Harvester design was chosen and rushed into production in January 1951, it would be standardized as the M39 series. Kaiser (renamed Kaiser-Jeep in 1963) also became a major manufacturer, with Diamond T and Mack building smaller numbers. In 1963 Kaiser-Jeep began building the final order, production was completed in 1965.

In the 1960s more trucks were required, and the Army wanted to replace the multifuel engines with a standard diesel. AM General (successor of Kaiser-Jeep) developed an updated and redesigned version of the M39 series. Standardized as the M809 series, the primary difference was the engine. The hood, frame, and fenders were lengthened to make room for the larger engine, and it had a redesigned grille. All had an air cleaner on the left front fender, a quick visual way to tell them from the earlier M39 series. Jeep/AM General built all M809s between 1969 and 1982.

The M939 series was a Product Improvement Package of the M809, with updated engine, transmission, and brakes. A new, larger cab and tilt-forward hood were a major visual change from earlier trucks. Early M939s were rebuilds of M809 vehicles, suffix –A2 are new production by Bowen-McLaughlin-York/BMY with later model Cummins engine.

== Engines ==
The 5-ton family had five different engines in its life, one gasoline, one multifuel, and three different diesels.

The M39 series had three different engines, all with different operating characteristics. The 1951 design was originally powered by a Continental R6602, a 224 horsepower (167 kW) 602 cubic inches (9.9 L) inline 6 cylinder gasoline engine. These models had no external air filter and had the exhaust outlet under the right side of the truck's body. The engine was a successful design but by 1960 its 4 miles per US gallon (1.7 km/L) and the use of gasoline as a fuel in heavy trucks were becoming a problem.

In 1962–1963 Diamond T and Mack began retrofitting M52 semi-tractors and M54 cargo trucks to the -A1 standard. They had a Mack ENDT-673, a 210 horsepower (160 kW) 672 cubic inches (11.0 L) turbocharged inline 6 cylinder diesel engine. These were the only diesel M39 series models.

The -A2 had the army standard design LDS-465-1 multifuel engine built by Continental. It was a 175 horsepower (130 kW) 478 cu in (7.8 L) turbocharged inline 6 cylinder multifuel engine. Using M.A.N. technology it was a diesel type that could also use other fuel oils or a gasoline/oil mix in an emergency. Also used by the M35 2 1/2-ton series this engine was successful in the smaller trucks but was underpowered compared to all other-5-ton models.

The M809 series used a Cummins NHC250 engine, a 855 cubic inches (14.0 L) naturally aspirated inline 6 cylinder diesel engine developing 240 horsepower (180 kW) at 2100rpm and 685 pound force-feet (929 N⋅m) of torque at 1500rpm. All models of the M809 series used this engine throughout their service life. The N series was a very successful commercial design, with a conservative rating the engine was more powerful and less stressed than the multifuel engine.

The M939 and M939A1 models were rebuilds of the M809 series and used their NHC 250 engine. Although the design is dated it is still powerful and reliable in service and was not significantly up-graded. The M939A2 new production models use a modern Cummins 6CTA8.3 240 horsepower (180 kW) 504 cubic inches (8.3 L) turbocharged and aftercooled inline 6 cylinder diesel engine. This is also a successful commercial design.

== Driveline ==
The M39 and M809 series had a Spicer 5 speed manual synchromesh transmission. The M939 used an Allison automatic, for better engine speed control and driving ease.

A two speed transfer case also engaged the front axle. M39s and M809s used one which engaged the front axle automatically if the rear wheels turned faster than the front, as when the rear wheels spun. The M939s had an improved type, which always engaged the front axle in the low range, in the high range the driver could engage and disengage it with an air control.

== Chassis ==
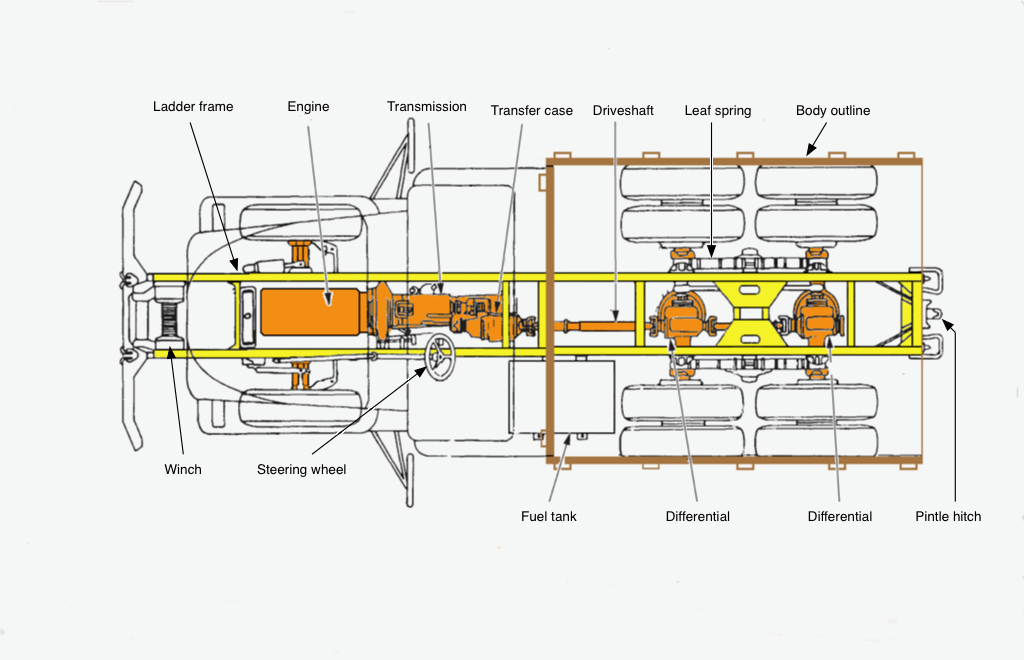
Overhead drawing of M939 series

A ladder frame with three live beam axles, the front on leaf springs, the rear tandem on leaf springs with locating arms. Brakes on the M39 and M809 were air over hydraulic with drum brakes on all wheels, M939s were full air. Many trucks were available with a front-mounted 20,000 lb (9,100 kg) capacity winch.

There were three wheelbases (Measurements are from the centerline of the front axle to the centerline of rear tandem). The short, used for tractors and dumps, was 167 inches (4.24 m), the long, used for cargo, wreckers, and bolsters, was 179 inches (4.55 m), and the extra long, used for long cargo, tractor wreckers, and expansible vans, was 215 inches (5.46 m).

Most models had 11.00x20 size tires with dual rear tires, bridge trucks and some chassis-cabs had 14.00x20 with dual rear tires. Early M939s used 11.00x20s with dual tires, but M939A1s had 14.00x20s with single rear tires and M939A2s introduced a central tire inflation system.

== Models ==
=== Cargo trucks ===
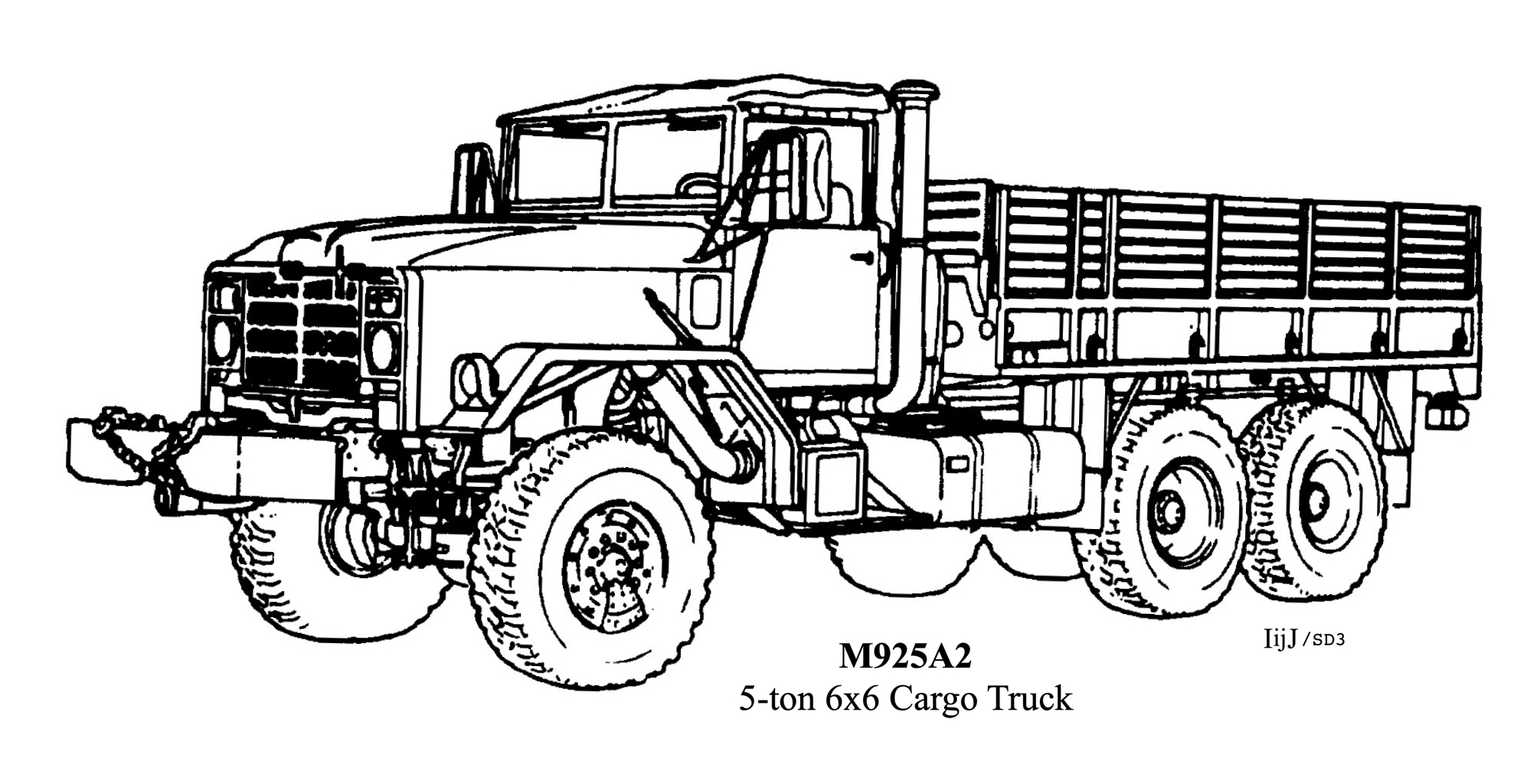
M925A2 dropside cargo truck w/winch

Cargo trucks had a 14 ft (4.3 m) long low sided box with a bottom hinged tailgate, bodies with drop sides were also standardized. Both had removable side racks with fold down troop seats and bows for a tarpaulin. Long cargo trucks, with an extra long wheelbase, had a 20 ft (6.1 m) long box with side racks and bows for a tarpaulin. There were no drop side versions, and none had troop seats.

=== Dump trucks ===
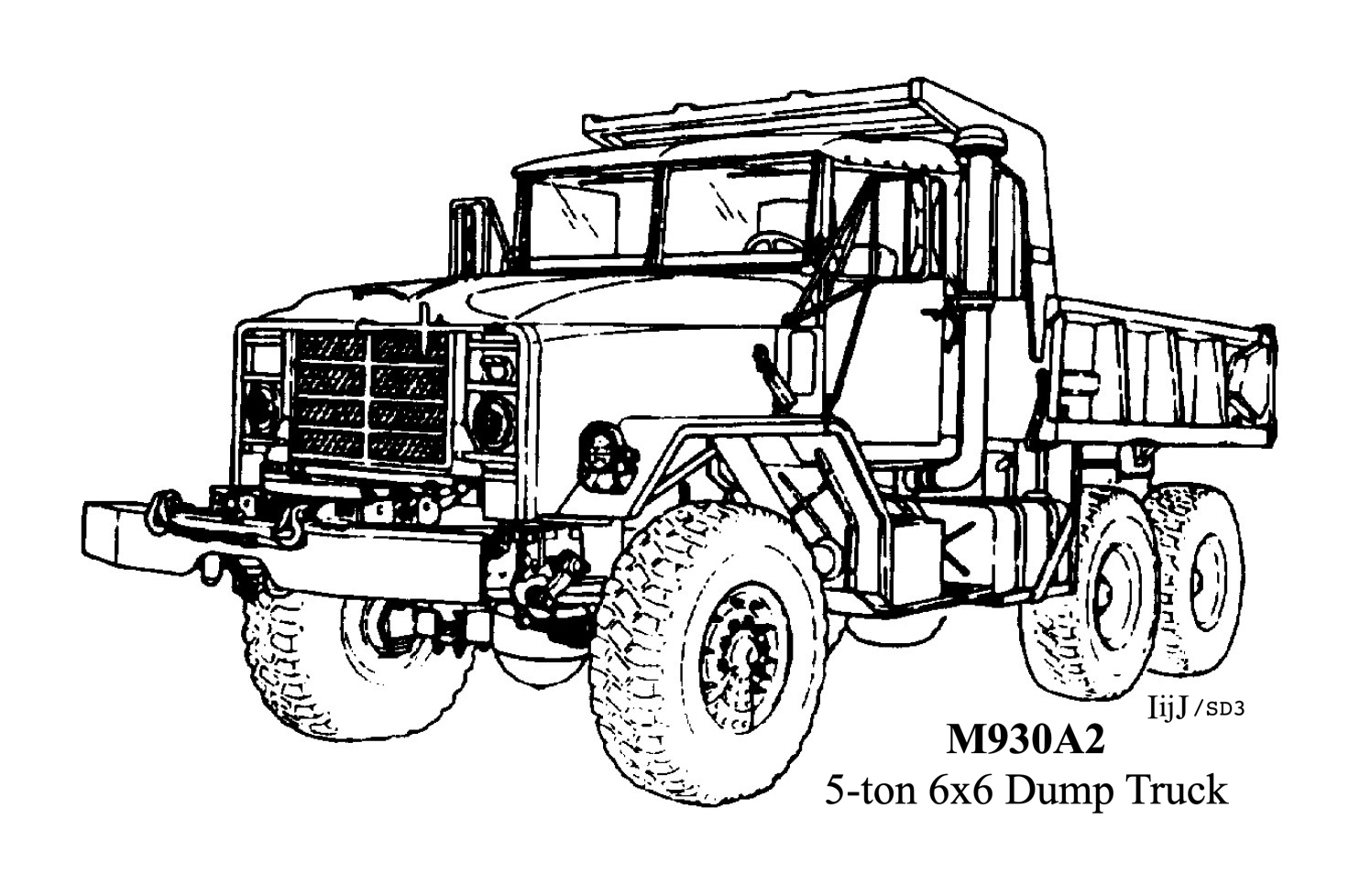
M930A2 Dump Truck w/winch

Dump trucks were used to haul sand, gravel, dirt, rubble, scrap, and other bulk materials. They had a 5 cubic yards (3.8 m^{3}) dump body with cab protector and a tailgate that could hinge at either the top or bottom. They could be equipped with overhead bows, a tarpaulin, and troop seats, but the relatively small size of the body limited their passenger or cargo load.

=== Medium wrecker trucks ===
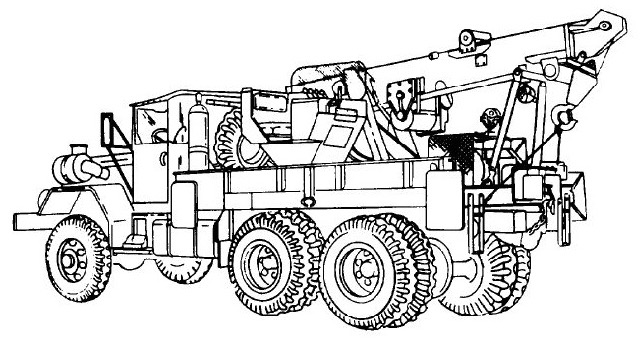
M816 Medium Wrecker Truck

Medium wrecker trucks were used to recover disabled or stuck trucks and lift large components. A rotating, telescoping, and elevating hydraulic boom could lift a maximum of 20,000 lb (9,100 kg). Although the truck was not meant to carry a load, the boom could support 7,000 lb (3,200 kg) when towing.

=== Tractor trucks ===
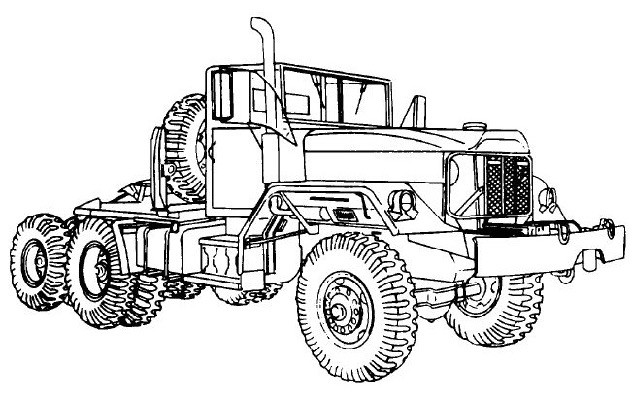
M818 Tractor Truck

Tractor trucks were used to tow semi-trailers up to 37,500 lb (17,000 kg) with 15,000 lb (6,800 kg) on their fifth wheel. On improved roads they could tow up to 55,000 lb (25,000 kg) with 25,000 lb (11,000 kg) on their fifth wheel.

Tractor trucks normally tow a 12-ton (24,000 lb (11,000 kg) load rated 4-wheel (two axles) trailer. There are stake/platform, van, tank, and low-bed models. There is also a 15-ton (30,000 lb (14,000 kg)) low bed trailer, the heaviest possible off-road. A 25-ton (50,000 lb (23,000 kg)) low-bed trailer can be towed on prepared surfaces.

Unlike commercial trucks the fifth-wheel can also pivot side to side, making a more flexible connection to the trailer. Even so, off-road performance is limited to relatively flat and solid ground.

=== Medium wrecker tractor trucks ===
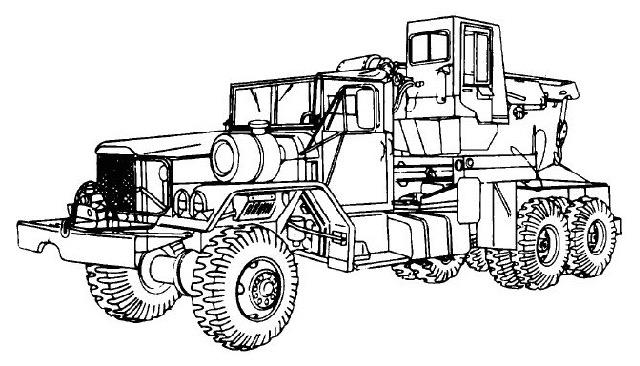
M819 Wrecker Tractor Truck

Medium wrecker tractor trucks, with an extra long wheelbase, were a wrecker with a fifth wheel mounted behind the boom. Meant for aircraft recovery, the truck could perform wrecker duties and load and tow semi trailers.

=== Expansible van trucks ===
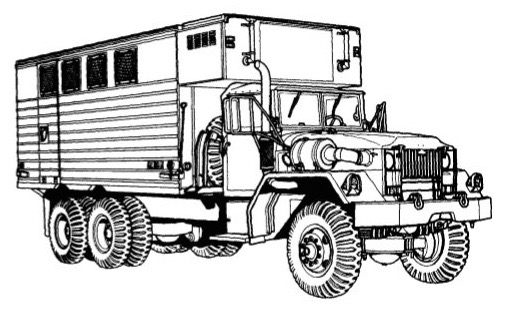
M291 Expansible Van Truck

Expansible van trucks had a 17 ft (5.2 m) long van body with a slide out section on each side. When the sections are extended the working floor was over 12 ft (3.7 m) wide. Some had hydraulic lift-gates.

=== Bridge transporting trucks ===
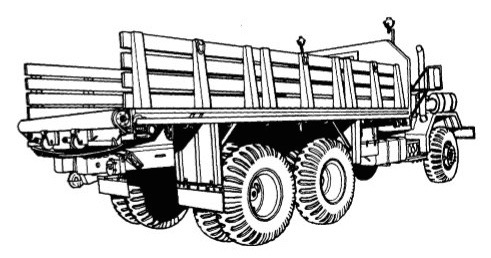
M328 Bridge Transporting Truck

Bridge transporting trucks had a stake body 20 ft (6.1 m) long for carrying bridging equipment and components. In the M939 series there were no standardized bridge models, instead specialized bodies were mounted on chassis-cabs.

=== Logging bolster trucks ===
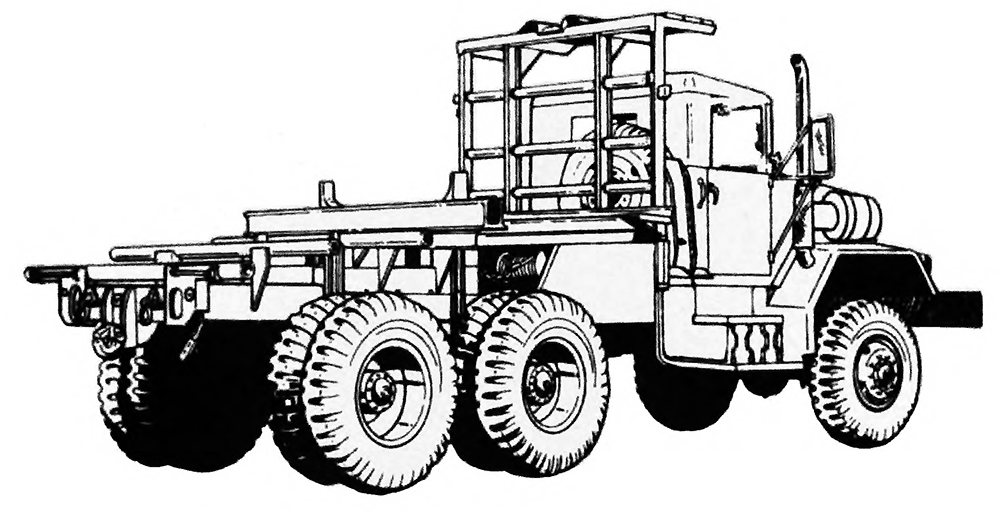
M748 Logging Bolster Truck

Logging bolster trucks, with a bolster trailer, were used to carry long loads like logs, poles, and bridge sections. When unloaded the trailer could be loaded onto the truck. There were no bolster trucks in the M939 series.

=== Chassis cabs ===
Chassis cabs were produced in different wheelbases for specialty bodies. The largest, the M39 series M139C/D, was an Honest John rocket launcher.

== Model numbers ==
| Model | wheelbase | M39 | M809 | M939 |
|---|---|---|---|---|
| Cargo, 14 ft bed | long | M54 | M813 | M923-M926 |
| Cargo, 20 ft bed | extra long | M55 | M814 | M927, M928 |
| Dump | short | M51 | M817 | M929, M930 |
| Tractor | short | M52 | M818 | M931, M932 |
| Wrecker | long | M62, M543 | M816 | M936 |
| Wrecker Tractor | extra long | M246 | M819 | |
| Expansible Van | extra long | M291 | M820 | M934, M935 |
| Bridge | extra long | M328 | M821 | |
| Logging Bolster | long | M748 | M815 | |
| Chassis, short | short | M61 | M810 | |
| Chassis, long | long | M40 | M809 | M944, M945 |
| Chassis, XL | extra long | M63 | M811 | M942, M943 |
| Chassis, XL HD | extra long | M139 | M812 | M927, M928 |

== Gallery ==
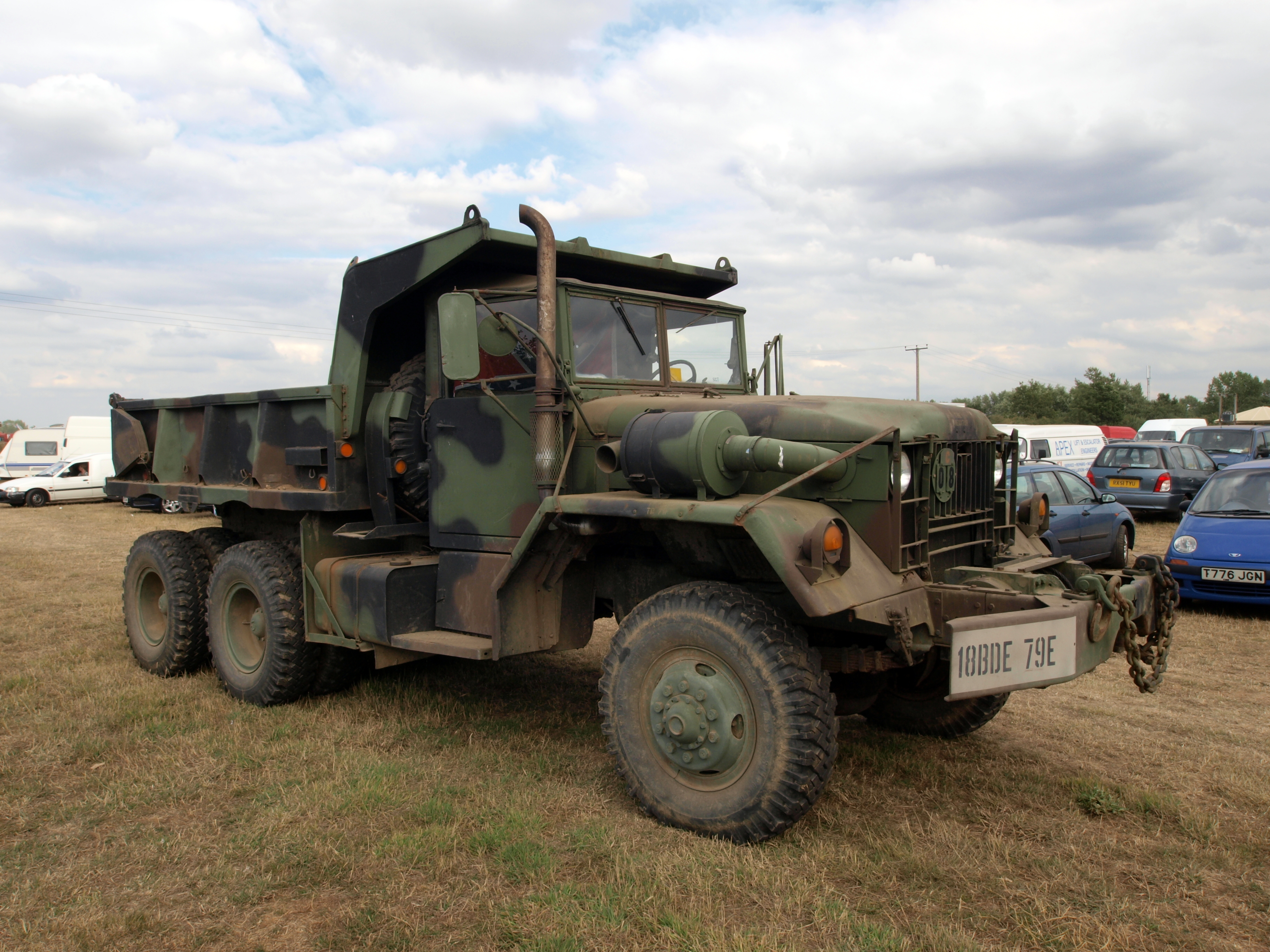
M51 Dump truck

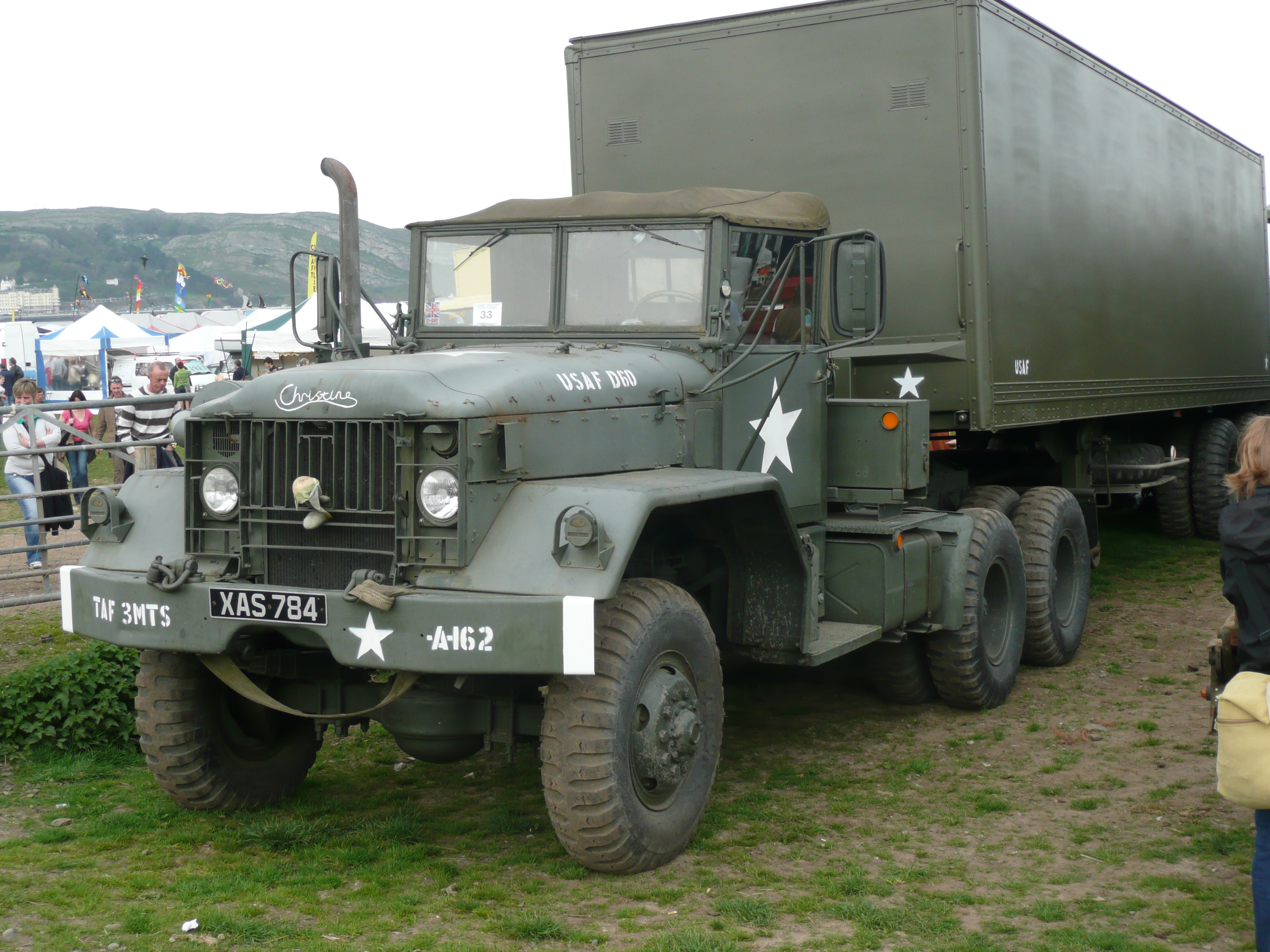
M52 Tractor

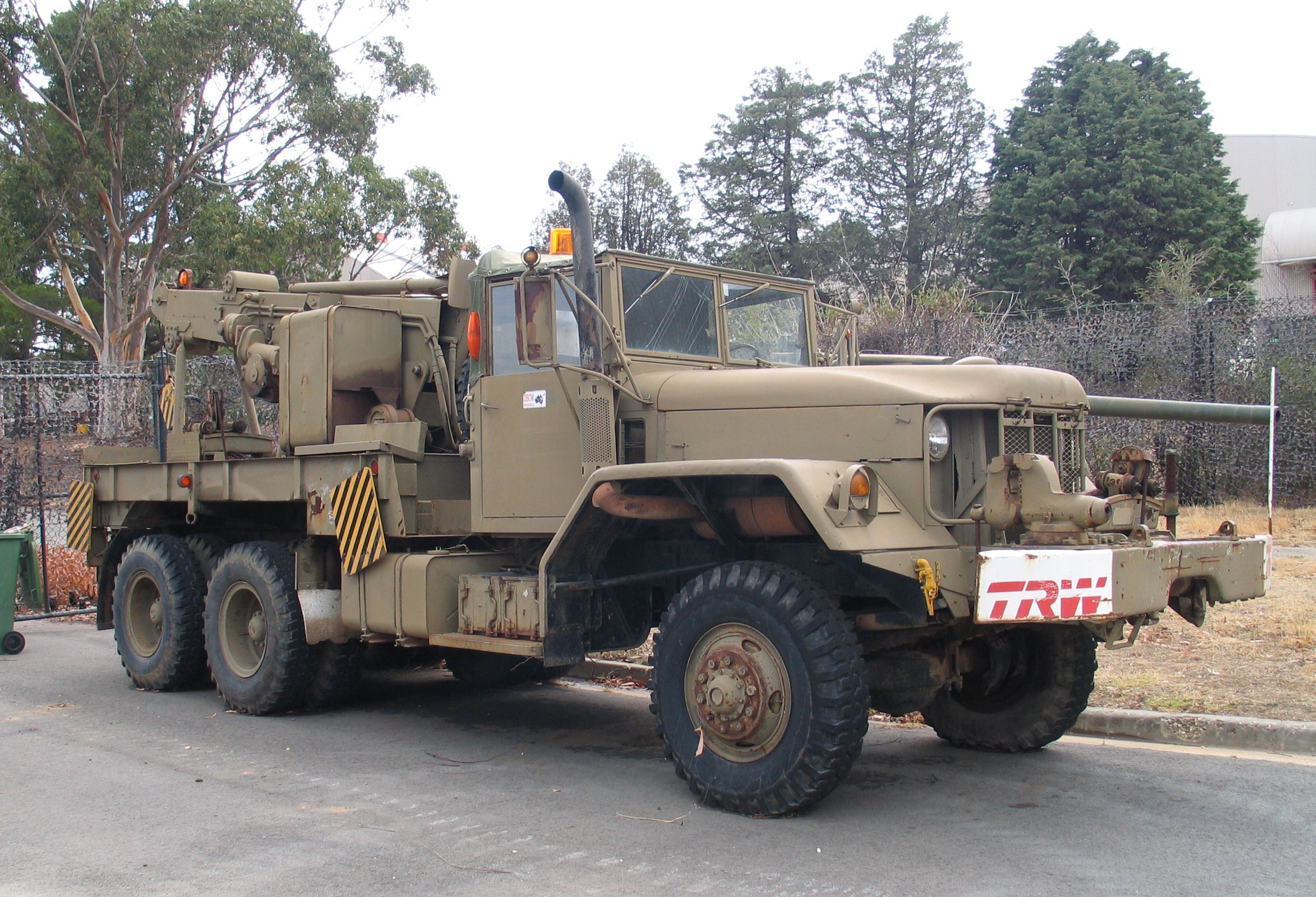
M816 Wrecker

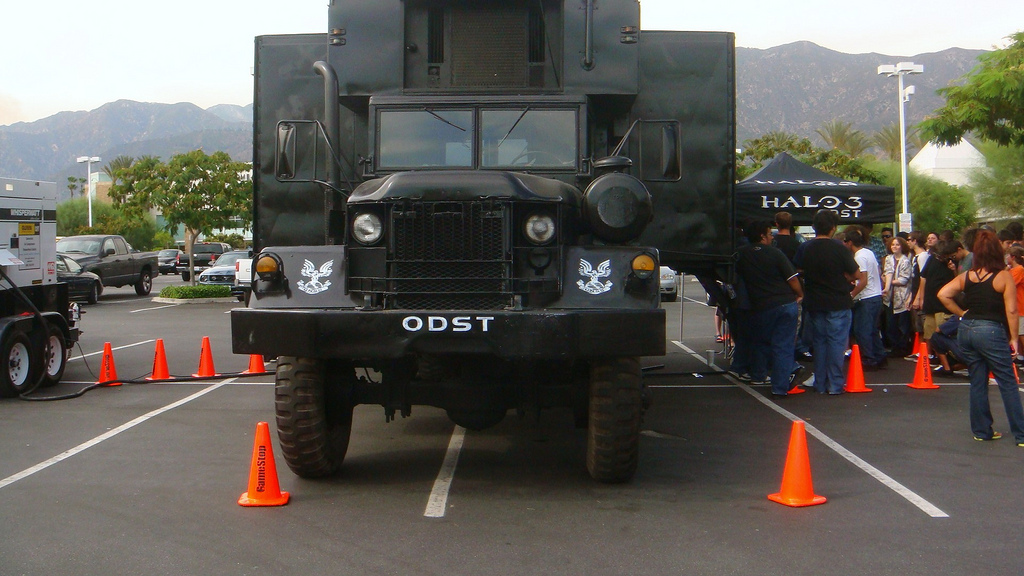
M820 Expansible Van

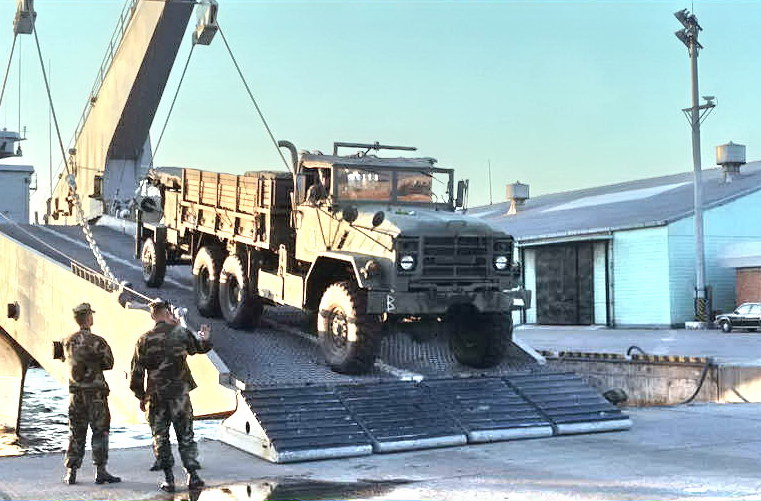
M923 Cargo truck

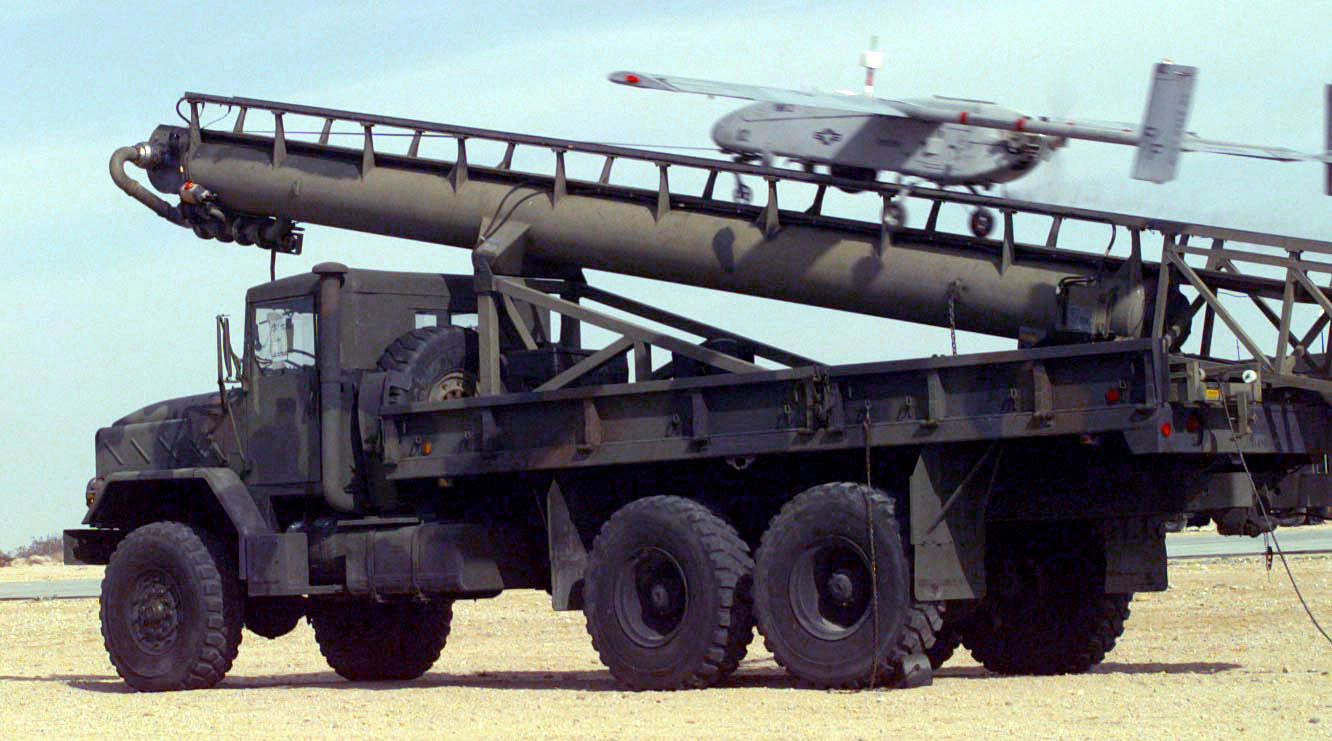
M927 w/drone launcher
