= HMS Easton =

Destroyer of the Royal Navy

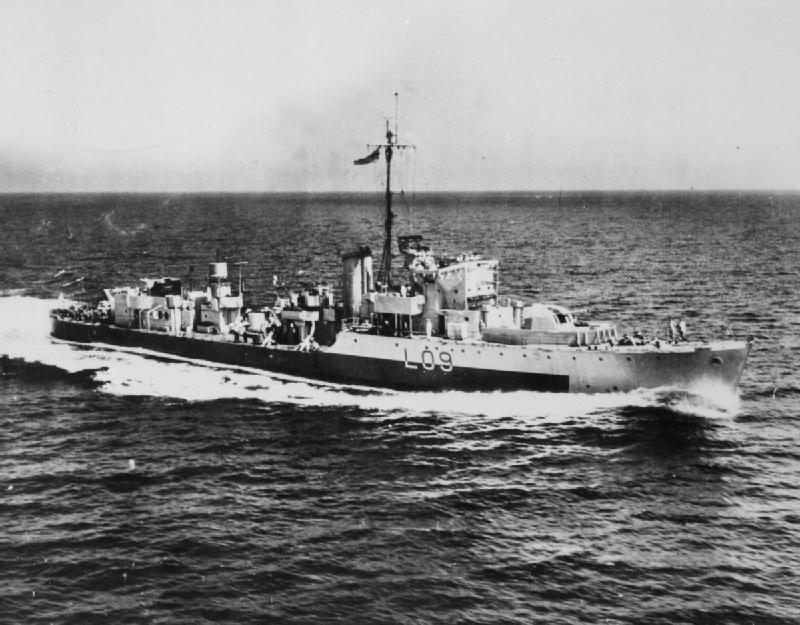

History

United Kingdom
- Name: Easton
- Ordered: 28 July 1940
- Builder: J Samuel White, Cowes
- Laid down: 25 March 1941
- Launched: 11 July 1942
- Commissioned: 7 December 1942
- Identification: Pennant number: L09
- Fate: Scrapped January 1953

General characteristics
- Class & type: Type III Hunt-class destroyer
- Displacement: 1,050 long tons (1,067 t) standard, 1,490 long tons (1,514 t) full load
- Length: 264 ft 3 in (80.54 m) pp, 280 ft (85.34 m) oa
- Beam: 31 ft 6 in (9.60 m)
- Draught: 7 ft 9 in (2.36 m)
- Propulsion: 2 Admiralty 3-drum boilers; 2 shaft Parsons geared turbines, 19,000 shp (14,000 kW)
- Speed: 27 knots (50 km/h; 31 mph)
- Range: 3,700 nmi (6,900 km; 4,300 mi) at 14 knots (26 km/h; 16 mph)
- Complement: 168
- Armament: 4 × QF 4 in Mark XVI guns on twin mounts Mk. XIX; 4 × QF 2 pdr Mk. VIII (1 × quad mount); 3 × 20 mm Oerlikons; 2 × 21 in (533 mm) torpedo tubes; 70 depth charges, 4 throwers, 2 racks

HMS Easton was a Type III Hunt-class destroyer of the British Royal Navy. Easton was built by the shipbuilder J Samuel White in 1941–1942, being launched on 11 July 1942 and completed on 7 December 1942.

Easton spent most of the Second World War in the Mediterranean Sea, where she took part in the sinking of two submarines, before returning to Britain in 1945. The ship's post-war service was limited, and after a period being used as a hulk, was scrapped in 1953.

== Construction ==
HMS Easton was ordered for the Royal Navy from the shipbuilder J Samuel White on 28 July 1940, one of six Hunt-class destroyers (four Type III and two Type IV) ordered as part of the 1940 War Emergency Programme on that date. The Hunt class was meant to fill the Royal Navy's need for a large number of small destroyer-type vessels capable of both convoy escort and operations with the fleet. The Type III Hunts differed from the previous Type II ships in replacing a twin 4-inch gun mount by two torpedo tubes to improve their ability to operate as destroyers.

Easton was 264 feet 3 inches (80.54 m) long between perpendiculars and 280 feet (85.34 m) overall. The ship's beam was 31 feet 6 inches (9.60 m) and draught 7 feet 9 inches (2.36 m). Displacement was 1,050 long tons (1,067 t) standard and 1,490 long tons (1,514 t) under full load. Two Admiralty boilers raising steam at 300 pounds per square inch (2,100 kPa) and 620 °F (327 °C) fed Parsons single-reduction geared steam turbines that drove two propeller shafts, generating 19,000 shaft horsepower (14,000 kW) at 380 rpm. This gave a speed of 27 knots (50 km/h; 31 mph). 345 long tons (351 t) of oil fuel were carried, giving a range of 3,700 nautical miles (6,900 km; 4,300 mi) at 15 knots (28 km/h; 17 mph).

Main gun armament was four 4 inch (102 mm) QF Mk XVI dual purpose (anti-ship and anti-aircraft) guns in two twin mounts, with a quadruple 2-pounder "pom-pom" and three Oerlikon 20 mm cannon providing close-in anti-aircraft fire. Two 21 inch (530 mm) torpedo tubes were fitted in a single twin mount, while two depth charge chutes, four depth charge throwers and 70 depth charges comprised the ship's anti-submarine armament. Type 291 and Type 285 radar was fitted, as was Type 128 sonar.

Easton was laid down at White's Cowes, Isle of Wight shipyard on 25 March 1941, was launched on 11 July 1942 and completed on 7 December 1942.

== Service ==
After workup at Scapa Flow during January 1943, Easton was ordered to join the Mediterranean Fleet, joining the 22nd Destroyer Flotilla, based at Alexandria in Egypt, being used for escort and patrol duties.

On 17 February 1943, Easton and sister ship Wheatland sank the Italian submarine Asteria off Bougie in Algeria. On 10 July 1943, the Allies invaded Sicily, with Easton escorting convoys carrying invasion forces to Sicily. On 22 August 1943, Easton was part of the escort for convoy MKF22 when she detected a submarine off Pantelleria, and carried out two depth charge attacks against the submarine, and called up the Greek-manned destroyer Pindos, which carried out a third depth charge attack. The submarine, U-458, was forced to the surface by these attacks, and then hit by gunfire by the two destroyers before being rammed by Easton. The impact sank U-458, with eight of the submarine's crew killed and the remaining 43 rescued. Easton's bow and propeller shafts were badly damaged, however, and Easton had to be towed into Malta by Pindos.

After temporary repairs at Malta, Easton underwent permanent repairs at Gibraltar, these continuing until 18 September 1944. She then joined the 59th Destroyer Division, and shelled Greek communist forces near Piraeus between 5 and 9 December 1944 during the early stages of the Greek Civil War. In 1945, Easton was recalled to British waters, joining the 21st Destroyer Flotilla based at Sheerness in March.

Easton was refitted at Southampton from May to August 1945, after which she was reduced to the reserve. She returned to active service with the Portsmouth-based 3rd Escort Flotilla in 1946, but spent much of the time under repair, and returned to reserve at Harwich in November 1947. A refit at Sheerness started on 8 August 1947, but was abandoned on 2 September owing to the poor condition of the ship which dated back to the collision damage received when sinking U-458 in 1943. After stripping of useful equipment, the ship was laid up at Rosyth and used as a training hulk for apprentices. Easton was scrapped by Metal Industries at their Rosyth yard in January 1953.

== Bibliography ==
- Blair, Clay (2000). Hitler's U-Boat War: The Hunted 1942–1945. New York: Modern Library. ISBN 0-679-64033-9.
- Critchley, Mike (1982). British Warships Since 1945: Part 3: Destroyers. Liskeard, UK: Maritime Books. ISBN 0-9506323-9-2.
- English, John (1987). The Hunts: A history of the design, development and careers of the 86 destroyers of this class built for the Royal and Allied Navies during World War II. World Ship Society. ISBN 0-905617-44-4.
- Gardiner, Robert; Chesneau, Roger, eds. (1980). Conway's All The World's Fighting Ships 1922–1946. London: Conway Maritime Press. ISBN 0-85177-146-7.
- Kemp, Paul (1997). U-Boats Destroyed: German Submarine Losses in the World Wars. London: Arms & Armour Press. ISBN 1-85409-321-5.
- Lenton, H. T. (1970). Navies of the Second World War: British Fleet & Escort Destroyers Volume Two. London: Macdonald & Co. ISBN 0-356-03122-5.
- Rohwer, Jürgen; Hümmelchen, Gerhard (1992). Chronology of the War at Sea 1939–1945. London: Greenhill Books. ISBN 1-85367-117-7.
- Whitley, M. J. (2000). Destroyers of World War Two: An International Encyclopedia. London: Cassell & Co. ISBN 1-85409-521-8.
- Winser, John de S. (2002). British Invasion Fleets: The Mediterranean and beyond 1942–1945. Gravesend, UK: World Ship Society. ISBN 0-9543310-0-1.
