= 2006 Chapel Hill attack =

Vehicular Attack in North Carolina, US

University of North Carolina SUV attack
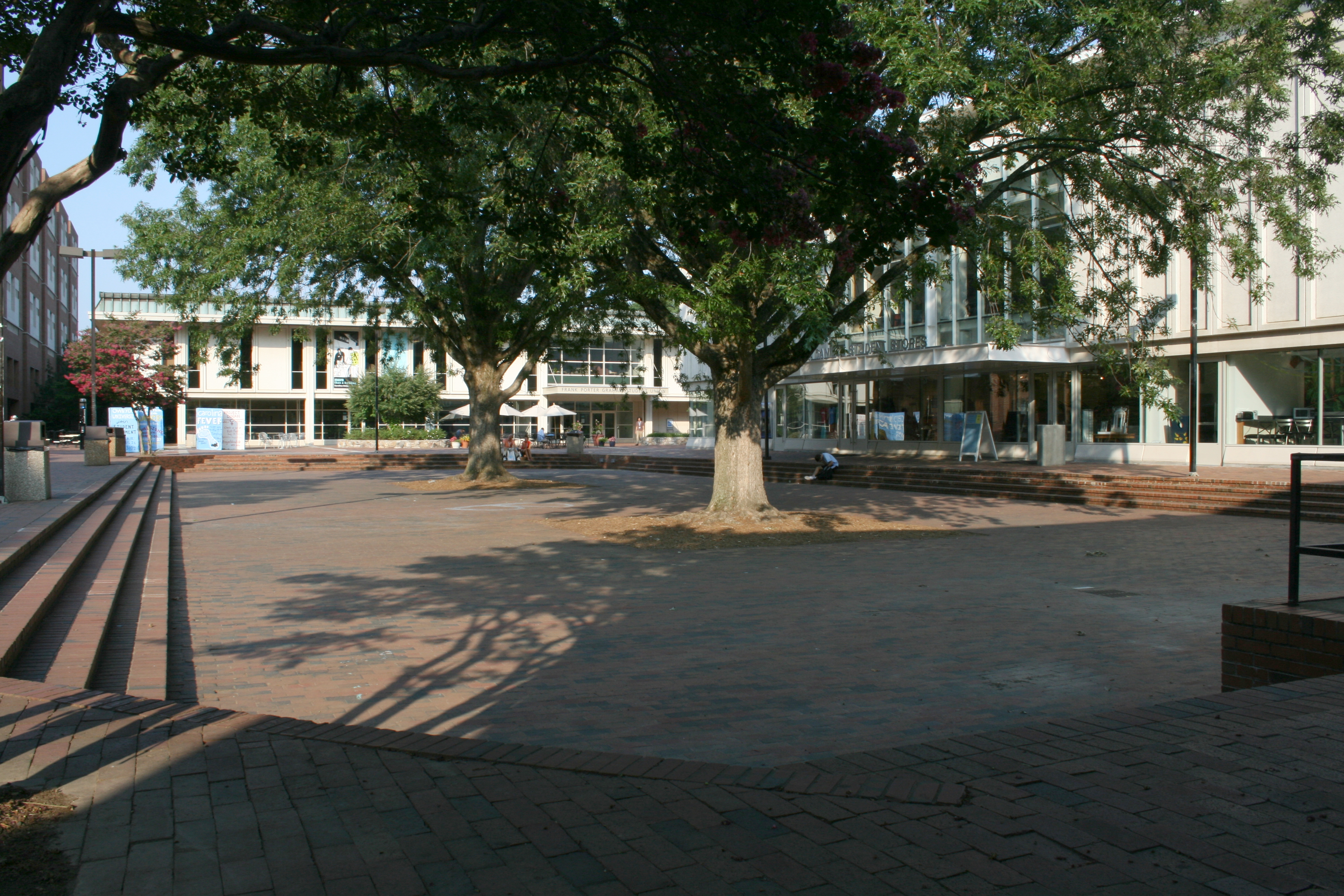
- The Pit, where the attack occurred
- Location: 35°54′36″N 79°2′55″W; University of North Carolina at Chapel Hill (UNC), Chapel Hill, North Carolina, U.S.
- Date: March 3, 2006; 20 years ago 12:01 p.m. (UTC)
- Attack type: Vehicular assault, attempted mass murder, Islamic terrorism
- Weapon: 2006 Jeep Grand Cherokee
- Deaths: 0
- Injuries: 9
- Perpetrator: Mohammed Reza Taheri-azar
- Motive: Islamic extremism

On March 3, 2006, Mohammed Reza Taheri-azar intentionally hit people with a sport utility vehicle on the campus of the University of North Carolina (UNC) at Chapel Hill to "avenge the deaths of Muslims worldwide" and to "punish" the United States government. While no one was killed in the vehicle-ramming attack, nine people received minor injuries.

Shortly after the attack, he turned himself in and was arrested. He pleaded guilty to nine counts of attempted first-degree murder, and in 2008, was sentenced to 33 years in prison, on two counts of attempted murder.

In one letter, Taheri-azar wrote, "I was aiming to follow in the footsteps of one of my role models, Mohamed Atta, one of the 9/11 hijackers, who obtained a doctorate degree." He told investigators he wanted to "avenge the deaths or murders of Muslims around the world."

== Attack ==
=== During the attack ===
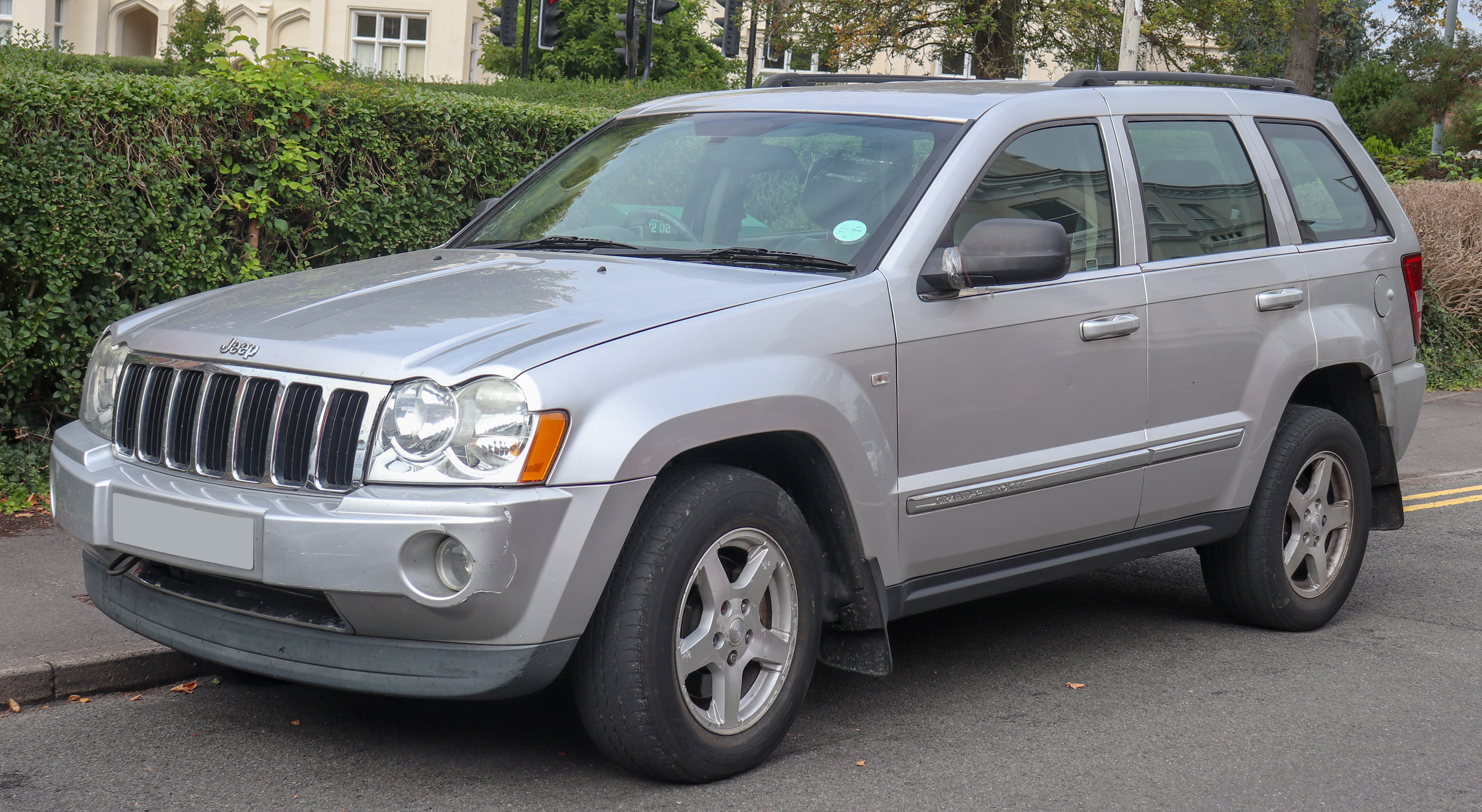
A similar Grand Cherokee to the one involved in the attack

On the afternoon of March 3, 2006, Taheri-azar drove a rented silver 2006 Jeep Grand Cherokee through a common courtyard area of campus known as the Pit, a high-traffic area centered between the student bookstore, student center, dining hall, and libraries. It is a popular gathering spot, filled not only with students going to and from class, but also with participants in various student organization-related activities.

While not readily accessible to vehicular traffic beyond a narrow service road, the barricades that normally prevent cars from approaching the Pit were not in place on the day of the attack. His top speed was estimated by witnesses to be from 40 to 45 miles per hour (64 to 72 km/h). He struck nine pedestrians, six of whom were taken to the hospital for treatment and released. The other three declined to be treated.

=== After the attack ===
Taheri-azar drove to Plant Road, a nearby city street, and called 911 to turn himself in to authorities. He calmly confessed to perpetrating the attack. He told the dispatcher his location and requested that he be arrested. He told the dispatcher that the reasons for his actions were outlined in a letter which he left on his bed in his Carrboro apartment. Taheri-azar then gave himself up upon the arrival of police at the scene. Later that afternoon, officials evacuated the apartment complex where Taheri-azar lived, then stormed the unit while media helicopters circled overhead. Along with the letter described in the 911 call, officials found his UNC diploma folded in his closet, and the Carolina blue graduation gown used just three months before.

On March 6, 2006, when he appeared in an Orange County courtroom, he stated that he would defend himself, and that he looked forward to the opportunity of sharing the will of Allah. He was charged with nine counts of attempted first-degree murder and nine counts of assault with a deadly weapon with intent to kill inflicting serious bodily injury before being held in Central Prison in Raleigh on a $5.5 million bond. On May 3, 2006, a grand jury indicted him on nine counts of attempted first-degree murder, four counts of assault with a deadly weapon with intent to kill, and five counts of assault with a deadly weapon with intent to kill inflicting serious injury. The case was set to go to superior court next, for either a trial or a plea. Early on, the FBI was involved in the investigation, but the exact involvement was unknown.

== Perpetrator ==
Although Taheri-azar was born on May 3, 1983, in Tehran, the capital of Iran, he is a naturalized U.S. citizen who moved to the United States at the age of two. He grew up in the Charlotte, North Carolina area, where he lived with his mother and younger and older sisters. He attended South Mecklenburg High School in Charlotte, where he was a socially awkward honor student who graduated in 2001. He had a proclivity for fast and expensive cars, and the South Mecklenburg High School yearbook dubbed him the "South's Speedster." He received four tickets between 2001 and 2003 for "unnecessary honking, driving down the middle of two lanes of traffic, and failure to obey directions at a police checkpoint," and for "traveling at 74 mph (119 km/h) in a 45 mph (72 km/h) zone."

He enrolled in the University of North Carolina at Chapel Hill in 2001, where he majored in psychology and philosophy. At one point he dropped out, but returned the following semester. In college, he volunteered at local hospitals. He graduated from UNC in December 2005. Some of those who knew him there described him as "a serious student, shy but friendly," and "kind and gentle, rather than aggressive and violent". A student who had been in the same history of philosophy class said he was "impressed" with Taheri-azar's "knowledge of classical Western thought." He was serious about his grades, and served briefly as the president of the UNC psychology club. However, not all of those who knew him had the same opinion. UNC Chancellor James Moeser described him as "totally a loner, introverted, and into himself".

Fellow Muslims characterized Taheri-azar as "cantankerous and unorthodox in his practice of Islam" and "anything but traditionally devout." During prayers on campus he "wouldn't pray toward Mecca and refused to recite prayers in Arabic – contrary to standard Islamic practice." One Muslim student, Atif Mohiuddin, recalled Taheri-azar as being "anti-Arabic" and never using the standard Arabic greeting of Assalaamu Alaikum.

UNC professor Charles Kurzman noted that Taheri-Azar had limited knowledge about Islam, not even knowing the difference between Sunnis and Shias or that al-Qaeda, with whom his role model Mohammad Atta was affiliated with, does not acknowledge him as a follower of the faith because he is Shia.

== Aftermath ==
Local Muslim leaders condemned the attack and the attempt by the assailant to link the Qur'an to his actions.

While UNC Chancellor James Moeser described Taheri-azar's attack as one of violence in an internal email to the university community, he stopped short of calling it a full-fledged act of terror. An official "Reclaim the Pit" event occurred on March 20, 2006, where students gathered for a moment of silence.

On August 26, 2008, Taheri-azar was sentenced on two counts of attempted murder to 26 years and two months to 33 years in prison by Orange County Superior Court. As of March 2016, he was projected to be released in April 2032. He is currently serving his sentence at the Warren Correctional Institute in Manson.
