= Gnaeus Cornelius =

Gnaeus Cornelius may refer to:

- Gnaeus Cornelius Blasio, Roman statesman and general
- Gnaeus Cornelius Cinna Magnus (born between 47 BC and 35 BC), Roman politician
- Gnaeus Cornelius Merula
- Gnaeus Cornelius Cossus (disambiguation)
- Gnaeus Cornelius Dolabella (disambiguation)
- Gnaeus Cornelius Scipio (disambiguation)
- Gnaeus Cornelius Lentulus (disambiguation)
