= Lucius Cornelius =

Several ancient Roman males with the family name Cornelius had Lucius as their first name (praenomen).

- Lucius Cornelius Alexander Polyhistor
- Lucius Cornelius Chrysogonus, a Greek freedman of Lucius Cornelius Sulla
- Lucius Cornelius Cinna (before 130 BC – early 84 BC), a four-time consul of the Roman republic
- Lucius Cornelius Latinianus, a Roman senator during the reign of Hadrian
- Lucius Cornelius Lentulus Crus (before 97 BC – 48 BC), an opponent of Caesar and supporter of Pompeius in the Civil War
- Lucius Cornelius Maluginensis Uritinus, a Roman politician and general of the 5th century BC
- Lucius Cornelius Pusio Annius Messalla, a Roman senator under the Flavian dynasty who held several offices in the emperor's service
- Lucius Cornelius Pusio Annius Messala (consul 90), a Roman senator who replaced the emperor Domitian as suffect consul
- Lucius Cornelius Scipio Barbatus (c. 337 BC – 270 BC), a Roman consul in 298 BC
- Lucius Cornelius Sisenna (c. 120 – 67 BC), a Roman soldier, historian, and annalist

== See also ==
- Lucius Cornelius Balbus (disambiguation)
- Lucius Cornelius Cinna (disambiguation)
- Lucius Cornelius Lentulus (disambiguation)
- Lucius Cornelius Merula (disambiguation)
- Lucius Cornelius Scipio (disambiguation)
