= Damasippus (Macedonian) =

2nd-century BC Macedonian general

- Δαμάσιππος
- Born: Macedonia
- Occupation: Mercenary soldier
- Era: 2nd century BC
- Known for: Fleeing Macedonia after murdering the council at Phacus

Damasippus (Ancient Greek: Δαμάσιππος) was a Macedonian who appears in the events surrounding the conflict between the two Ptolemies (Ptolemy VI Philometor and Ptolemy Physcon) in 162 BC.

== Damasippus story ==
After murdering the members of the council at Phacus (a Macedonian town), Damasippus fled from Macedonia with his wife and children. He reached Peraea, opposite Rhodes, where he was received and entertained by the inhabitants, and from there he resolved to sail to Cyprus.

He subsequently entered the service of the younger Ptolemy (Ptolemy Physcon), who was at that time in Greece collecting a large force of mercenaries. Damasippus was among those enlisted. When the Roman commissioners, Torquatus and his colleagues, observed that Ptolemy had assembled a formidable force, they reminded him that their commission was to restore him without war. They persuaded him to abandon his plan of invading Cyprus, to proceed as far as Side in Pamphylia, and there to disband his mercenaries. Ptolemy nevertheless retained about one hundred Cretan soldiers and returned with them to Africa.

Damasippus remained attached to the younger Ptolemy. He accompanied him when he sailed first to Crete, together with Gnaeus Cornelius Merula, one of the Roman commissioners. While in Crete, Ptolemy enlisted about a thousand additional soldiers. From there he crossed to Libya, landing at Apis, and later marched toward Cyrene, after learning that the Cyreneans had revolted and taken the field against him.
