= Lucius Cornelius Sulla (disambiguation) =

Lucius Cornelius Sulla may refer to:

- Lucius Cornelius Sulla Felix (138–78 BCE), Roman politician, general, and dictator
- Lucius Cornelius Sulla (consul 5 BC), Roman senator of the Augustan age
- Lucius Cornelius Sulla Felix (consul 33), Roman senator of the first century CE

== See also ==
- Lucius Cornelius (disambiguation)
