= Manlius Torquatus =

Manlius Torquatus may refer to one of the following individuals from Roman gens Manlia:

- Aulus Manlius Torquatus Atticus
- Lucius Manlius Torquatus (consul 65 BC)
- Titus Manlius Imperiosus Torquatus, consul in 347, 344, and 340 BC.
- Titus Manlius Torquatus, grandson of the above, consul in 299 BC who died in office.
- Titus Manlius Torquatus, great-grandson of the above, consul in 235 and 224 BC.
- Titus Manlius Torquatus, grandson of the above, consul in 165 BC.
