= Cornelius Scipio =

Cornelius Scipio may refer to:

- Gnaeus Cornelius Scipio (disambiguation)
- Lucius Cornelius Scipio (disambiguation)
- Publius Cornelius Scipio (disambiguation)
- Servius Cornelius Scipio Salvidienus Orfitus

== See also ==
- Scipio (disambiguation)
