= Scipio =

Scipio may refer to:

== People ==
=== Ancient Rome ===
- Scipio Aemilianus, Roman general who destroyed Carthage in 146 BC
- Scipio Africanus, Roman general who defeated the Carthaginian leader Hannibal in 202 BC
- Lucius Cornelius Scipio Asiaticus, brother of Africanus, Roman general who defeated the Seleucid king Antiochus III in 190 BC
- Gnaeus Cornelius Scipio Asina, Roman general who was defeated in the Battle of the Lipari Islands in 260 BC
- Quintus Caecilius Metellus Pius Scipio, Roman politician, opponent of Julius Caesar
- Cornelius Scipio (disambiguation)

=== Given names ===
- Scipio Africanus Jones (1863–1943), African-American educator
- Scipio Africanus (slave) (c. 1702 – 1720), African slave in England known for his epitaph
- Scipio Colombo (1910–2002), Italian opera singer
- Scipio Moorhead (active c. 1773), enslaved African-American artist
- Scipio Slataper (1888–1915), writer from Austro-Hungarian Trieste
- Scipio Spinks (born 1947), American baseball player
- Scipion Abeille (died 1697), French surgeon
- Scipione Ammirato (1531–1601), Italian historian
- Scipione Barbò Soncino (active by 1570s), Italian jurist
- Scipione Borghese (1577–1633), Italian cardinal
- Scipione Borghese, 10th Prince of Sulmona (1871–1927), Italian prince
- Scipione Breislak (1748–1826), Italian geologist
- Scipione del Ferro (1465–1526), Italian mathematician
- Scipione de' Ricci (1741–1810), Italian bishop
- Scipione Gentili (1563–1616), German law professor
- Scipione (Gino Bonichi) (1904–1933), Italian painter
- Scipione Pulzone (1544–1598), Italian painter
- Scipione Rebiba (1504–1577), Italian cardinal
- Scipione Tecchi (1854–1915), Italian cardinal
- Elmer Scipio Dundy (1830–1896), Nebraska judge
- Andrew Scipione (born 1958), Australian police commissioner
- Francesco Scipione, marchese di Maffei (1675–1755), Italian writer

=== Pseudonym ===
- Scipio, pseudonym used by Alexander Hamilton (1755 or 1757 – 1804), American lawyer and statesman

== Place names ==
=== United States ===
==== Indiana ====
- Scipio, Indiana and Ohio, an unincorporated community in Franklin County, Indiana, and Butler County, Ohio
- Scipio, Indiana, a census-designated place in Jennings County
- Scipio Township, Allen County, Indiana
- Scipio Township, LaPorte County, Indiana

==== Kansas ====
- Scipio, Kansas

==== Michigan ====
- Scipio Township, Michigan

==== New York ====
- Scipio, New York (Cayuga County)
- Scipio Center, New York, a hamlet in the above town

==== Ohio ====
- Scipio Township, Meigs County, Ohio
- Scipio Township, Seneca County, Ohio
- Scipio, Ohio, in Butler County

==== Oklahoma ====
- Scipio, Oklahoma

==== Utah ====
- Scipio, Utah (Millard County)

=== Italy ===
- Tomb of the Scipios

== Creative works ==
- Dream of Scipio (Latin: Somnium Scipionis), a story by Cicero, c. 51 BC
- The Dream of Scipio (novel), a 2002 novel by Iain Pears
- Il sogno di Scipione, a dramatic serenade by Mozart, premiered in 1772
  - Scipio's Dream, a 1992 opera by Judith Weir
- Scipione (opera), a 1726 opera by Handel
- Scipione affricano, an opera by Francesco Cavalli, premiered in 1664
- Hannibal and Scipio, a play by Thomas Nabbes, first performed in 1635
- "Scipio", a song by Sky from the 1980 album Sky 2
- Scipio, a character in Cornelia Funke's The Thief Lord

== Ships ==
- HMS Scipio, name of several British warships
- HMS Scipion, name of several British warships
- French ship Scipion, name of several French warships

== Other ==
- Scipionyx, dinosaur
- Scipio, character from the 2000 novel The Thief Lord
- Scipio, a fictional planet in the sixth season of the animated television series Star Wars: The Clone Wars
- Scipio, character from the Southern Victory Series by Harry Turtledove

== See also ==
- Scipione
