= Gnaeus Cornelius Scipio =

Gnaeus Cornelius Scipio may refer to:

- Gnaeus Cornelius Scipio Asina (lived during the 3rd century BC), a Roman general and statesman
- Gnaeus Cornelius Scipio Calvus (died 211 BC), was a Roman general and statesman
- Gnaeus Cornelius Scipio Hispanus, a Roman politician, son of following
- Gnaeus Cornelius Scipio Hispallus, a Roman politician

== See also ==
- Cornelius Scipio (disambiguation)
- Gnaeus Cornelius (disambiguation)
