= Lucius Cornelius Scipio =

Lucius Cornelius Scipio may refer to:

- Lucius Cornelius Scipio (consul 259 BC)
- Lucius Cornelius Scipio (praetor 174 BC)
- Lucius Cornelius Scipio Asiaticus, consul in 190 BC, victor of the Battle of Magnesia (190 BC)
- Lucius Cornelius Scipio Asiaticus (consul 83 BC)
- Lucius Cornelius Scipio Barbatus, consul 298 BC and patrician censor 280 BC

== See also ==
- Cornelius Scipio (disambiguation)
- Lucius Cornelius (disambiguation)
