= Ptolemy VIII Physcon =

8th Pharaoh of Ptolemaic Egypt

Ptolemy VIII Euergetes II
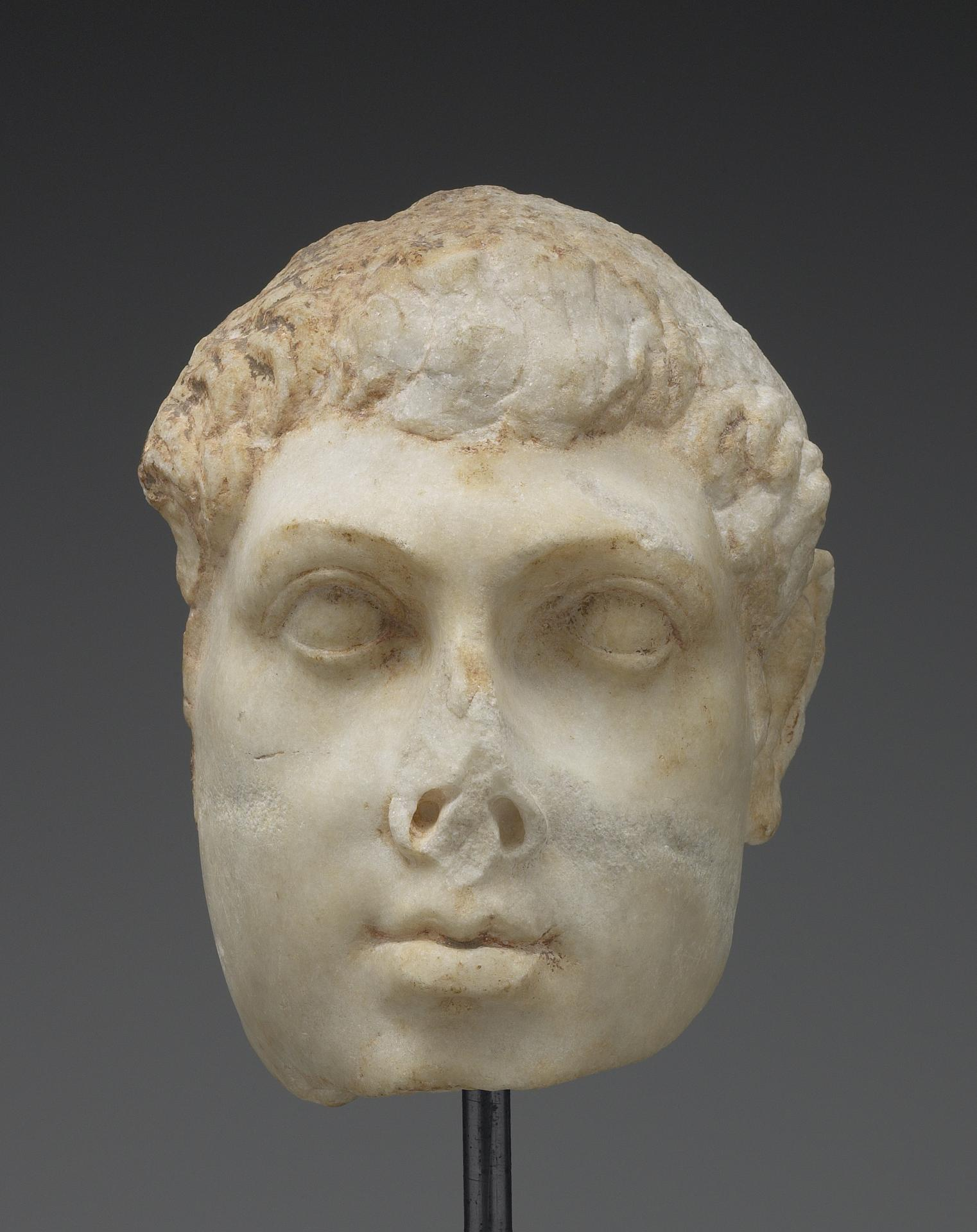
- Bust of a Ptolemaic king, most likely Ptolemy VIII.

Pharaoh and King of the Ptolemaic Kingdom
- Reign: 170–164 BC with Ptolemy VI and Cleopatra II; 145–132/131 BC with Cleopatra II and Cleopatra III; 127/126–116 BC with Cleopatra III and (from 124 BC) with Cleopatra II
- Predecessor: Ptolemy VI and Cleopatra II
- Successor: Ptolemy IX and Cleopatra II and Cleopatra III
Royal titulary
Horus name
ḥwnw ḥkn.tw-m-Ꜥnḫ.f-ḥr-nst-jt.f mꜤr-zpw ḏsr-msḫꜤw.f-ḥnꜤ-ḥpw-Ꜥnḫ
Hunu hekentuemankhefhernesetitef marzepu djesermeskhauefhenahapuankh
The youthful one, about whose life on his father’s throne one is joyful,
successful of deeds, and whose appearances with the living Apis bull are sacred
| G5 | H wn n W nw A17 F18 k n D19 tanx f nw x D2 T28 Z1 pr t f Z1 f M30 O48 Z2 D45 r ms xa Z2 f H n a H p Aa5 anx E1 |
Second Horus name:
ḥwnw ḥkn.tw-ḥr-nst-jt.f tjt-ḏsr(t)-nt-nsw-nṯrw stp-n-jmn-ḏs.f
Hunu hekentuhernesutitef titdjeser(et)netnesunetjeru setepenamundjesef
The youthful one, about whose father’s throne one is joyful,
the sacred image of the king of the gods, chosen by Atum himself
| G5 | H M42 nw A17 D19 t D2 Z1 st t f Z1 f t D17 D45 r y t n sw Z2 nTr stp n t U15 D&z&f |
Third Horus name:
ḥwnw ḥri-tp-pḏt zꜢ-wsjrj msj-n-Ꜣst šzp-n.f-nsyt-rꜤ-mꜤ-jt.f
Hunu heryteppedjet zausiry mesyenaset shesepenefnesytramaitef
The youthful one, leader of the Nine Bows, the son of Osiris,
whom Isis has borne, who has received for himself the kingship of Ra from his father’s hand
| G5 | H M42 nw A17 D2 D1 pD Z3 Z3 Z3 zA Z1 st nTr B3 n st t H8 O42 n f sw i i t D12 G20 t f Z1 f |
Nebty name
shrw-jb-tꜢwj
Seheruibtawy
Who has pleased the Two Lands
| G16 | s h r ib Z1 M13 wAD |
| G16 | z h r ib Z1 N17 N16 N21 N21 |
Golden Horus
wr-pḥtj nb-ḥbw-sd-mj-jt.f-ptḥ-tꜢ-ṯnn-jt-nṯrw-jty-mj-rꜤ
Werpehty nebhabusedmitefptahtatjenenitnetjeruitymire
The one great of strength, a possessor of Sed festivals like his father Ptah Tatenen,
the father of the gods, and a sovereign like Ra
| G8 | wr r F9 F9 nb O23 mi t f Z1 f p t H C18 t f nTrw A21 x Z1 mi |
Prenomen
jwꜤ-n-nṯrwj-prwj stp.n-ptḥ jrj-mꜢꜤt-rꜤ sḫm-Ꜥnḫ-n-jmn
Iwaennetjerwyperwy setepenptah irymaatre sekhemankhenamun
Heir of the two gods, chosen by Ptah, who has accomplished the Maat (of?) Ra, the living image of Amun

| M23 X1 L2 X1 | nTr N8 nTr F44 n p t H stp n ir Aa11 C2 C12 sxm anx |
Nomen
ptwlmjs Ꜥnḫ-ḏt mrj-ptḥ
Ptolemys ankhdjet meryptah
Ptolemaios, living forever, beloved of Ptah

| G39 N5 | p t wA l M i i s anx D&t&N17 p t H mr i i |

| G39 N5 | p t wA l M i i s anx D&t&N17 p t H N36 |
- Consorts: Cleopatra II of Egypt (m. 145 BC); Cleopatra III of Egypt (m. 142 or 141 BC)
- Children: Ptolemy Apion, King of Cyrene (illegitimate); Ptolemy Memphites; Ptolemy IX, King of Egypt; Ptolemy X, King of Egypt; Cleopatra IV, Queen of Egypt; Tryphaena, Queen of Syria; Cleopatra Selene, Queen of Syria
- Father: Ptolemy V of Egypt
- Mother: Cleopatra I of Egypt
- Born: c. 184 BC
- Died: 28 June 116 BC (aged around 68)
- Dynasty: Ptolemaic

Ptolemy VIII Euergetes II Tryphon (Note: Numbering the Ptolemies is a modern convention. Older sources may give a number one higher or lower. The most reliable way of determining which Ptolemy is being referred to in any given case is by epithet (e.g. "Philopator").) (Greek: Πτολεμαῖος Εὐεργέτης Τρύφων, Ptolemaĩos Euergétēs Tryphōn, "Ptolemy the Benefactor, the Opulent"; c. 184 BC – 28 June 116 BC), nicknamed Physcon (Φύσκων, Physkōn, "Sausage"), was a king of the Ptolemaic kingdom . He was the younger son of King Ptolemy V and Queen Cleopatra I. His reign was characterised by fierce political and military conflict with his older siblings, Ptolemy VI and Cleopatra II.

Ptolemy VIII was originally made co-ruler with his siblings in the run-up to the Sixth Syrian War, in 170 BC. In the course of that war, Ptolemy VI was captured and Ptolemy VIII arguably became sole king of Egypt. When the war ended and Ptolemy VI was restored to the throne in 168 BC, the two brothers continued to quarrel. In 164 BC Ptolemy VIII drove out his brother and became sole king of the Ptolemaic empire, but he was expelled in turn in 163 BC. As a result of Roman intervention, Ptolemy VIII was awarded control of Cyrene. From there he repeatedly tried to capture Cyprus, which had also been promised to him by the Romans, from his brother.

After Ptolemy VI's death in 145 BC, Ptolemy VIII returned to Egypt as co-ruler and spouse of his sister Cleopatra II. His cruel treatment of the opposition and his decision to marry his niece Cleopatra III and promote her to the status of co-regent led to a civil war from 132/1 to 127/6 BC, in which Cleopatra II controlled Alexandria and enjoyed the support of the Greek population of the country, while Ptolemy VIII and Cleopatra III controlled most of the rest of Egypt and were supported by the native Egyptians. During this war, native Egyptians were promoted to the highest echelons of the Ptolemaic government for the first time. Ptolemy VIII was victorious and ruled alongside Cleopatra II and Cleopatra III until his death in 116 BC.

The ancient Greek sources on Ptolemy VIII are extremely hostile, characterising him as cruel and mocking him as fat and degenerate, as part of a contrast with Ptolemy VI, whom they present extremely positively. The historian Günther Hölbl calls him "one of the most brutal and at the same time one of the shrewdest politicians of the Hellenistic Age."

== Background and early life ==
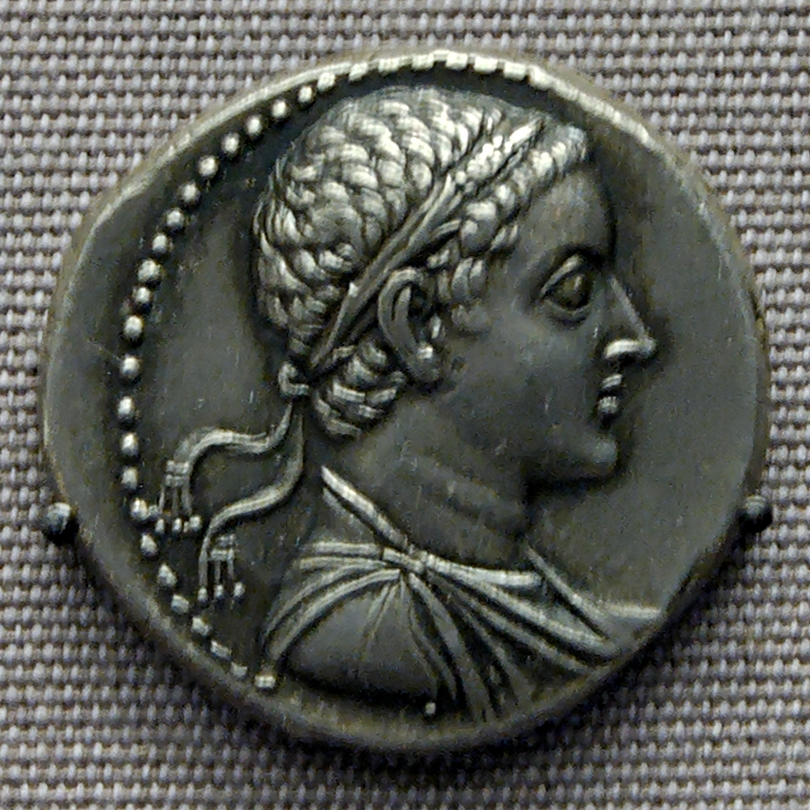
Coin of Ptolemy V, father of Ptolemy VIII

Ptolemy VIII was the younger son of Ptolemy V, who reigned from 204 to 180 BC. Ptolemy V's reign had been dominated by the Fifth Syrian War (204–198 BC), in which the Ptolemaic realm fought against the Seleucid king Antiochus III, who ruled the Near East and Asia Minor. In that war, Antiochus III had completely defeated the Ptolemaic forces, annexed Coele-Syria and Judaea to his empire, and reduced Egypt to a subordinate position. The new situation was solidified with a peace treaty, in which Ptolemy V married Antiochus III's daughter Cleopatra I in 194 BC. Ptolemy VI was the eldest son of the couple, born in 186 BC, and was the heir to the throne from birth. They also had a daughter, Cleopatra II. Their youngest child, Ptolemy VIII, was probably born around 184 BC.

The defeat in the Fifth Syrian War cast a shadow over the rest of Ptolemy V's reign. One prominent faction within the Ptolemaic court agitated for a return to war in order to restore Egyptian prestige, while another faction resisted the expense involved in rebuilding and remilitarising the realm. When Ptolemy V died unexpectedly in September 180 BC, at the age of only 30, he was succeeded by Ptolemy VI. Since the new king was only six years old, actual power rested with the regents - first Cleopatra I (180–178/7 BC) and then Eulaeus and Lenaeus (178/7–170 BC). These regents were more closely associated with the peaceful faction and, as a result, members of the warhawk faction seem to have begun to look to the young Ptolemy VIII as a potential figurehead for their movement.

== First reign (170–163 BC) ==
=== Accession and the Sixth Syrian War (170–168 BC) ===
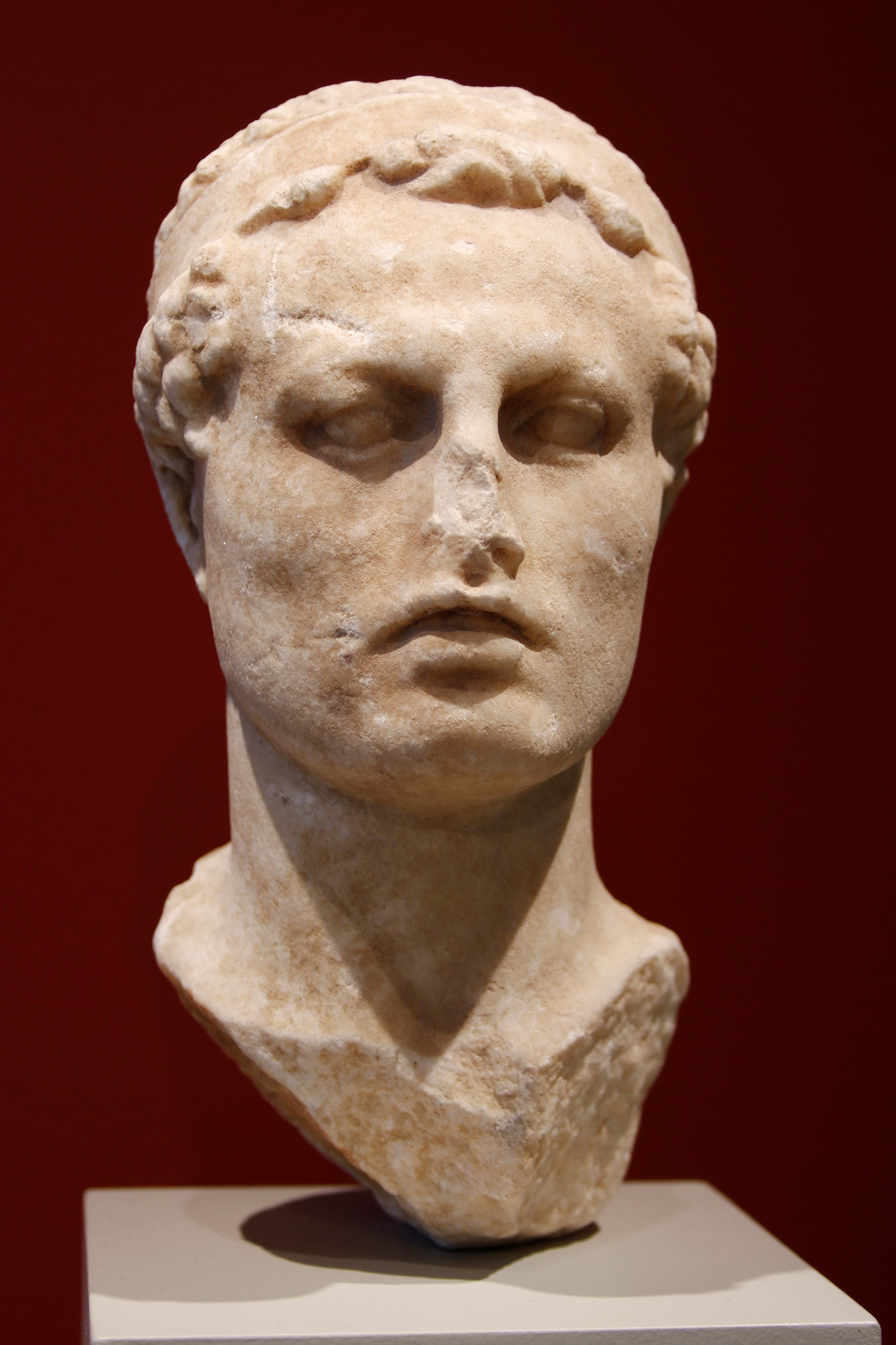
Antiochus IV

The Seleucid king Seleucus IV, who had followed a generally peaceful policy, was murdered in 175 BC, and after two months of conflict his brother Antiochus IV secured the throne. The unsettled situation empowered the warhawks in the Ptolemaic court and Eulaeus and Lenaeus made efforts to conciliate them. By 172 BC, they seem to have embraced the warhawks' position.

In October 170 BC, Ptolemy VIII, now about sixteen, was promoted to the status of co-regent and incorporated into the Ptolemaic dynastic cult as one of the Theoi Philomētores (Mother-loving gods) alongside his brother and sister, who had now been married to one another. The current year was declared the first year of a new era. John Grainger argues that these ceremonies were intended to paper over the factional differences that had developed in the court and to promote unity in the run-up to war. Ptolemy VI remained the senior king, as demonstrated later in 170 BC by the declaration of Ptolemy VI's adulthood and the celebration of his coming-of-age ceremony (the anakleteria), marking the formal end of the regency government. In practice, however, the regents Eulaeus and Lenaeus remained in charge of the government.

The Sixth Syrian War broke out shortly after this, probably in early 169 BC. Ptolemy VIII probably remained in Alexandria, while the Ptolemaic army set out from the border fort of Pelusium to invade Palestine. The Ptolemaic army was intercepted and decimated by Antiochus IV's army in the Sinai. The defeated army withdrew to the Nile Delta, while Antiochus seized Pelusium and then moved on the Delta.

As a result of this defeat, Eulaeus and Lenaeus were toppled by a military coup and replaced with two prominent Ptolemaic generals, Comanus and Cineas. As Antiochus IV advanced on Alexandria, Ptolemy VI went out to meet him. They negotiated an agreement of friendship, which in effect reduced Egypt to a Seleucid client state. When news of the agreement reached Alexandria, the people of the city rioted. Comanus and Cineas rejected the agreement, rejected Ptolemy VI's authority and declared Ptolemy VIII the sole king (Cleopatra II's position remained unchanged). Antiochus IV responded by placing Alexandria under siege, but he was unable to take the city and withdrew from Egypt in September 169 BC, as winter approached, leaving Ptolemy VI as his puppet king in Memphis and retaining a garrison in Pelusium.

Within two months, Ptolemy VIII and Cleopatra II reconciled with Ptolemy VI and he returned to Alexandria as their co-regent. The restored government repudiated the agreement that Ptolemy VI had made with Antiochus IV and began to recruit new troops from Greece. In response, in spring 168 BC, Antiochus IV invaded Egypt for a second time. Officially, this invasion was justified by the claim that Ptolemy VIII had unjustly appropriated his older brother's authority. Antiochus IV quickly occupied Memphis and was crowned king of Egypt and advanced on Alexandria. However, the Ptolemies had appealed to Rome for help over the winter and a Roman embassy led by Gaius Popillius Laenas confronted Antiochus at the town of Eleusis and forced him to agree to a settlement, bringing the war to an end.

=== From joint rule to sole rule (168–163 BC) ===
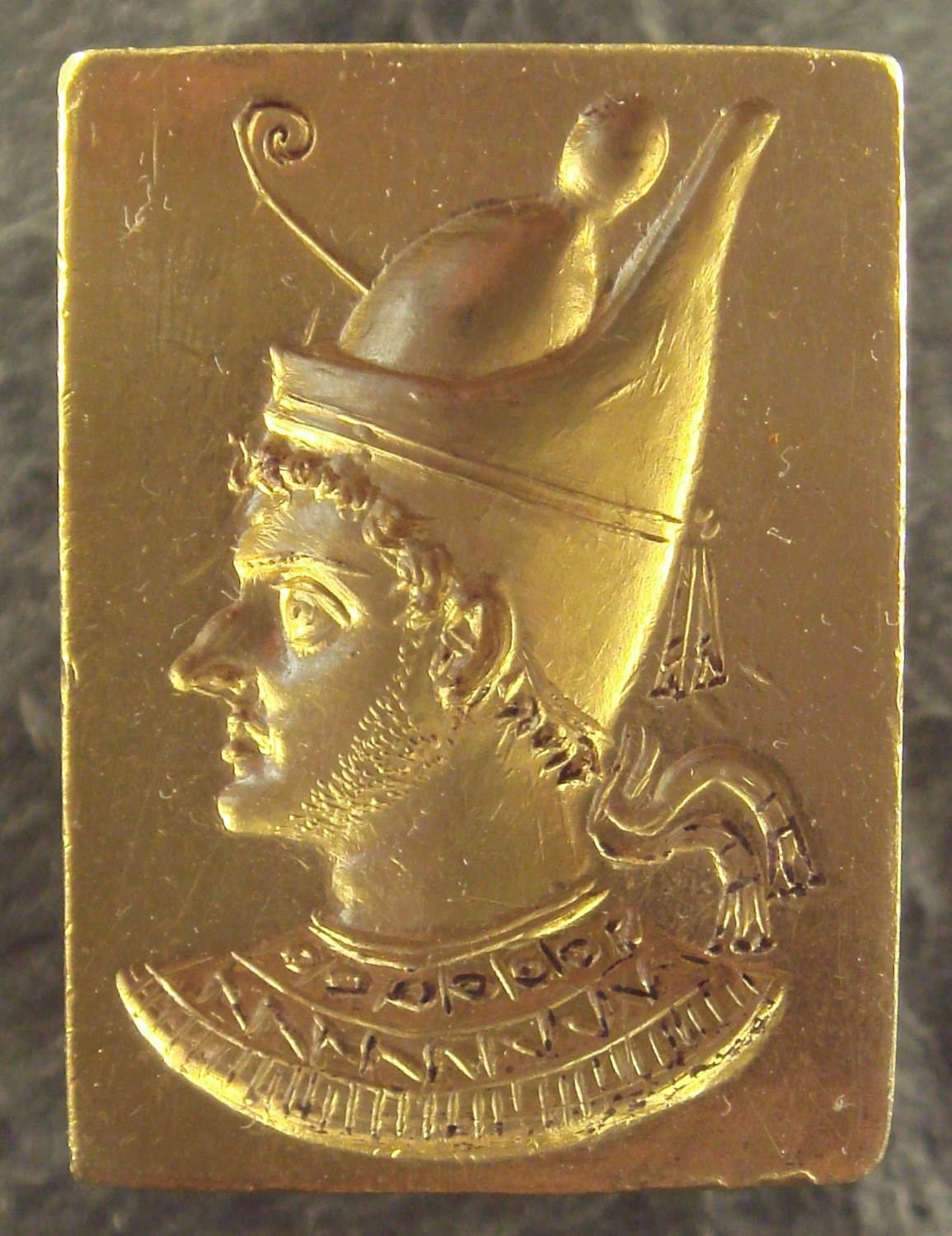
Ring of Ptolemy VI as Egyptian pharaoh, Louvre

Initially, the joint rule of the two brothers and Cleopatra II, which had been established during the war, continued. However, the complete failure of the Egyptian forces in the Sixth Syrian War had left the Ptolemaic monarchy's prestige seriously diminished and it caused a permanent rift between Ptolemy VI and Ptolemy VIII.

In 165 BC, Dionysius Petosarapis, a prominent courtier who appears to have been of native Egyptian origin, attempted to take advantage of the conflict between the brothers in order to take control of the government. He announced to the people of Alexandria that Ptolemy VI had tried to get him to assassinate Ptolemy VIII and tried to whip up a mob to support him. Ptolemy VI managed to convince Ptolemy VIII that the charges were untrue and the two brothers appeared publicly together in the stadium, defusing the crisis. Dionysius fled the city and convinced some military contingents to mutiny. Heavy fighting took place in the Fayyum over the next year. This and another revolt in the Thebaid – the latest in a series of rebellions that had attempted to overthrow the Ptolemies and re-establish native Egyptian rule. Ptolemy VI successfully suppressed the rebellion after a bitter siege at Panopolis.

Late in 164 BC, probably not long after Ptolemy VI had returned from the south, Ptolemy VIII, who was now about twenty years old, somehow ousted Ptolemy VI and Cleopatra II from power. Ptolemy VI fled to Rome and then Cyprus. The exact course of events is not known, but Diodorus Siculus reports that the instigator of the expulsion was a man named Timotheus, who then became the dominant minister. Ptolemy VIII now assumed the epithet Euergetēs ('benefactor'), which recalled his ancestor Ptolemy III and distinguished him from Ptolemy VI and Cleopatra II who both bore the epithet Philomētōr. Ptolemy VIII is said to have behaved tyrannically, and his minister Timotheus used torture and arbitrary executions to eliminate his enemies. In summer 163 BC, the people of Alexandria rioted against Ptolemy VIII, expelling him in turn and recalling Ptolemy VI.

== Reign in Cyrenaica (163–145 BC) ==
On his return to power, a pair of Roman agents convinced Ptolemy VI to grant Ptolemy VIII control of Cyrenaica. Ptolemy VIII departed for Cyrene, but he was not satisfied. In late 163 or early 162 BC, he went to Rome to request help. The Senate was convinced that the division was unfair, declaring that Ptolemy VIII ought to receive Cyprus as well. The ancient historian Polybius believed that the Senate made this decision with the conscious goal of weakening Ptolemaic power. Titus Manlius Torquatus and Gnaeus Cornelius Merula were sent as envoys to force Ptolemy VI to concede this. From Rome, Ptolemy VIII went to Greece where he recruited soldiers (including Damasippus) in preparation for an expedition to seize Cyprus by force. He had sailed to Rhodes with this fleet when he encountered Torquatus and Merula, who convinced him to discharge his troops and return to Cyrene. He went to the border between Egypt and Cyrene, waiting with a force of 1,000 Cretan mercenaries at a small town just west of Paraetonium for the results of the Roman negotiations with Ptolemy VI. Ptolemy VIII had been waiting there for forty days when Ptolemy Sempetesis, the governor that Ptolemy VIII had left in charge of Cyrene in his absence, suddenly raised a revolt. Ptolemy VIII marched to suppress the revolt and was defeated in battle. He regained control over Cyrene by the end of 162 BC, but it is not known whether he achieved this by negotiation or military action.

However, when Torquatus and Merula arrived in Alexandria, Ptolemy VI successfully put them off until he heard about the revolt, at which point he refused their demands. They had to return to Rome without achieving their goal. In winter 162/61 BC, the Roman Senate responded to this by breaking off relations with Ptolemy VI and to grant Ptolemy VIII permission to use force to take control of Cyprus, but they offered him no tangible support. He launched a military expedition to Cyprus in 161 BC. This expedition lasted up to a year, before fierce Cypriot resistance forced him to abandon the enterprise.

In 156 or 155 BC, Ptolemy VIII faced a failed assassination attempt, which he attributed to his older brother. Ptolemy VIII went to Rome and displaying the scars he had received in the attempt to the Senate. As a result of the embassy, the Roman Senate agreed to send a second embassy in 154 BC, led by Gnaeus Cornelius Merula and Lucius Minucius Thermus, with an honour guard of troops, in order to enforce the transfer of Cyprus to Ptolemy VIII's control. Ptolemy VIII was besieged by his older brother at Lapethus and was captured. Ptolemy VIII was persuaded to withdraw from Cyprus, in exchange for continued possession of Cyrenaica, an annual payment of grain, and a promise of marriage to one of Ptolemy VI's infant daughters (probably Cleopatra Thea) once she came of age.

=== Relations with Rome ===
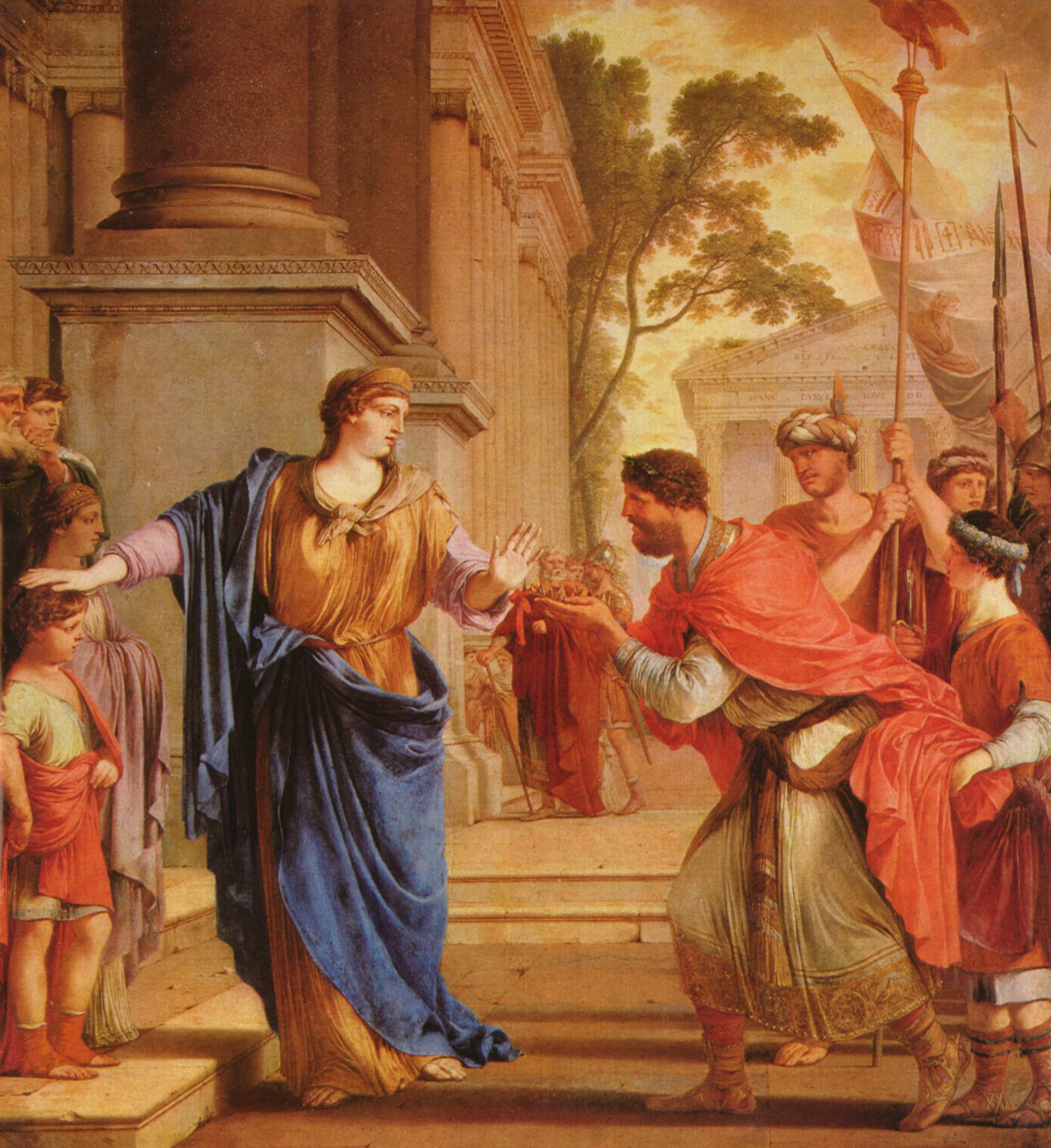
Cornelia pushes away Ptolemy's crown, by Laurent de La Hyre

Throughout his time as king in Cyrene, Ptolemy VIII maintained extremely close relations with Rome. From 162 BC, he was an official amicus et socius (friend and ally) of the Roman Republic. During his time in Rome he is said to have met Cornelia. In 152 BC, after the death of her husband, Tiberius Sempronius Gracchus, Ptolemy VIII allegedly asked for her hand in marriage, which she refused. This encounter was popular in neoclassical art, but it is unlikely that it ever actually took place. Even if untrue, the story may reflect close ties between Ptolemy VIII and the gentes Cornelia and Sempronia. By contrast, Ptolemy VI seems to have maintained ties with Cato the Elder.

An inscription from 155 BC, set up in the aftermath of the assassination attempt records Ptolemy VIII's will, in which he bequeaths Cyrenaica to Rome if he died childless. This act is not mentioned by any literary source but it fits with the very close alignment between Ptolemy VIII and the Romans that is attested in the literary sources. Similar testaments are known from other contemporary monarchs, notably Attalus III of Pergamum. They were often used by monarchs as an attempt to protect themselves from assassination or coup. Ptolemy VIII's will would be the earliest example of this practice. L. Criscuolo has argued that the inscription of Ptolemy's will is actually a forgery produced by the Romans after they gained control of Cyrenaica in 96 BC. However, it is quite possible that the text of the testament itself is authentic, but was only publicly disseminated in inscriptions by the Romans after they took over the country.

=== Relations with Numidia ===
Ptolemy VIII maintained a significant relationship with Numidia, highlighted by his close friendship with King Massinissa. This connection was established in 163 BC when Ptolemy VIII ascended to the throne of Cyrene. During this period, Massinissa was renowned for fostering relationships with Greek states and promoting a policy of Hellenization. Ptolemy VIII's interactions with Numidia were notably demonstrated by the dedication of a bust to Massinissa's son, Mastanabal, a distinguished athlete.

The two rulers are believed to have met between 163 and 148 BC, with a plausible location being Massinissa's main residence at Cirta. While the exact details of their meeting remain uncertain, Athenaeus' references to Ptolemy VIII's Memoirs suggest the occurrence of a banquet hosted by Massinissa. During this event, Massinissa reportedly expressed astonishment at the Syracusans' preference for pet monkeys over children, an anecdote recounted by Ptolemy VIII.

=== Spectacle and construction ===
As king of Cyrene, Ptolemy VIII attempted to display the Hellenistic royal virtue of tryphe (luxury). The main priesthood in Cyrene was the position of the priest of Apollo. Ptolemy VIII assumed this position and discharged his duties, especially the hosting of feasts, extremely sumptuously. He also engaged in a wide-ranging construction project in the city. A large tomb west of Ptolemais seems to have been intended as his final resting place.

== Second reign (145–132/131 BC) ==
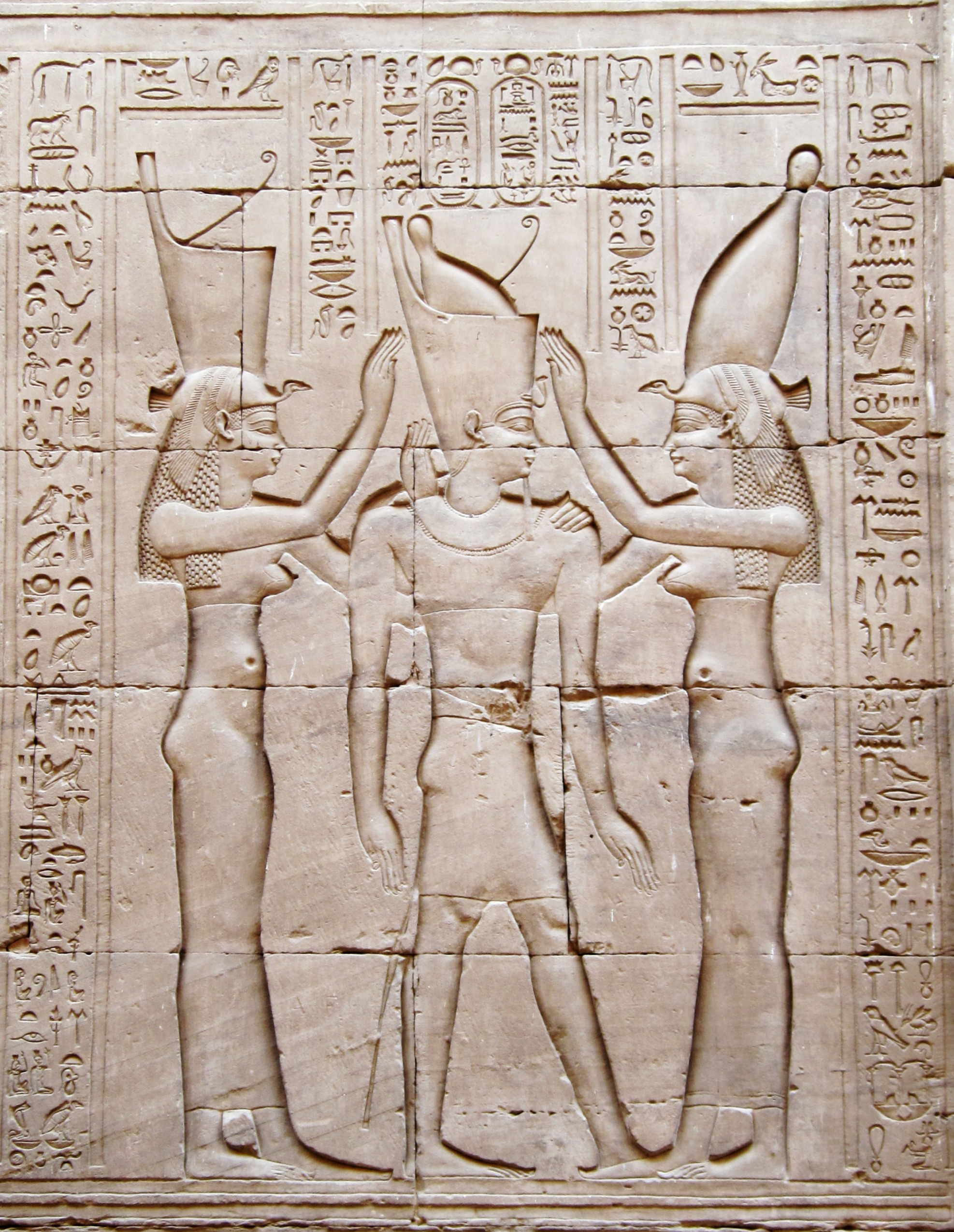
Ptolemy VIII being crowned by Nekhbet and Wadjet, personifications of Upper and Lower Egypt, in the Temple of Horus at Edfu

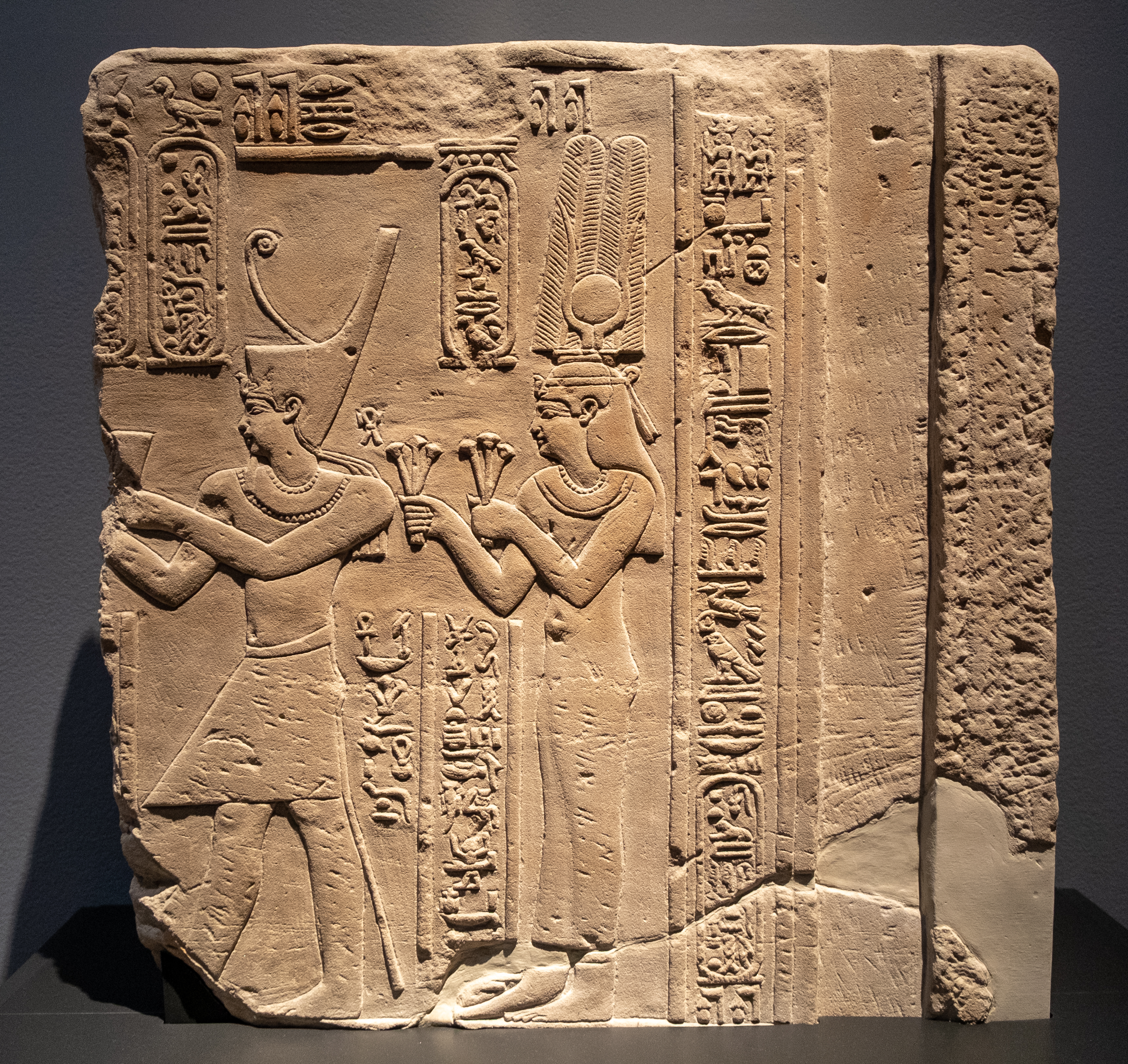
Ptolemy VIII as Egyptian pharaoh

Ptolemy VI died on campaign in Syria in 145 BC. Ptolemy VI may have intended for his seven-year-old son, also named Ptolemy, to succeed him, but the Alexandrians called on Ptolemy VIII to return from Cyrene, assume the kingship and marry his older sister, Cleopatra II. The royal couple were incorporated into the dynastic cult as the Theoi Euergetai ('benefactor gods') - Cleopatra II having previously been one of the Theoi Philomētores with Ptolemy VI. Ptolemy VIII was inaugurated as pharaoh at Memphis in 144 or 143 BC, during which time the couple's only child, Ptolemy Memphites, was born.

On his return to Alexandria in 145 BC, Ptolemy VIII is reported to have launched a purge of those who had opposed him and supported Ptolemy VI. This purge is luridly described in the literary sources, though it is sometimes difficult to determine whether specific anecdotes belong to this event or his later reconquest of Alexandria in 126 BC. Justin reports that Ptolemy VIII let his soldiers rampage through the streets of Alexandria, murdering indiscriminately, until he was "left alone with his soldiers in so large a city, and found himself a king, not of men, but of empty houses." Valerius Maximus says that when the young men of Alexandria took refuge in the gymnasion, Ptolemy VIII set the building on fire. It is probably in this period that Ptolemy VIII gained a number of pejorative nicknames, including Physkōn ("fatty") and Kakergetēs ("Malefactor") - a pun on his official epithet Euergetēs ("Benefactor"). His accession also marked the end of Ptolemaic presence in the Aegean Sea. Within months of his accession, he had withdrawn all troops from Itanos, Thera, and Methana, the last remaining Ptolemaic bases in the Aegean. The Ptolemaic empire was now limited to Egypt, Cyprus, and Cyrene.

Ptolemy VIII probably had his young nephew Ptolemy murdered. According to Justin, Ptolemy VIII did the deed personally, on the night of his wedding to Cleopatra II in 145 BC, and the boy died in his mother's arms. Documentary evidence from papyri indicates that in reality, the boy was initially maintained as heir and only removed sometime after the birth of Ptolemy Memphites, since in c. 143 BC, Ptolemy the son of Ptolemy VI served as eponymous priest of Alexander the Great. By the late 140s BC, Ptolemy Memphites had been declared heir, and was depicted as king on reliefs of the Temple of Edfu, although there is no evidence for any co-regency between him and his father.

Between 142 and 139 BC, Ptolemy VIII married Cleopatra III, daughter of Ptolemy VI and Cleopatra II, and made her co-ruler, without divorcing Cleopatra II. According to Livy, Ptolemy VIII had initiated a relationship with his niece shortly after his accession which he now made official. Daniel Ogden has argued that the marriage to Cleopatra III may not have been planned from the outset, but a measure taken to prevent her from being married to someone else who might use that marriage in order to claim the throne. However, the new arrangement led to conflict with Cleopatra II.

Apparently in response to this new marriage and with the support of Cleopatra II, an Athamanian mercenary captain formerly in Ptolemaic service, Galaestes, initiated a revolt. Galaestes had been a trusted officer under Ptolemy VI but had been forced into exile in 145 BC. In Greece, he gathered an army of other Ptolemaic exiles, then announced that he had a young son of Ptolemy VI in his care and crowned this boy as king. Galaestes attacked Ptolemy VIII, intending to put this child on the throne. Ptolemy VIII's mercenaries, whose pay was in arrears, nearly defected to the challenger, but their commander, Hierax, prevented this by paying their wages from his own money. By February 139 BC, Galaestes had been defeated and Ptolemy VIII had issued a decree affirming the rights and privileges of the Egyptian priesthood, in which he represented himself, Cleopatra II, and Cleopatra III as harmoniously ruling together.

In the same year, Ptolemy VIII received a Roman embassy, led by Scipio Aemilianus, which was intended to effect a peaceful settlement of all affairs in the Eastern Mediterranean. The ancient sources emphasise the sumptuous greeting that the Romans received, mostly in order to contrast it with the austere behaviour of the Romans. By this point he was apparently enormously fat and was transported everywhere in a litter.

== Civil war (132–126 BC) ==
In late 132 BC, the conflict between the royal siblings finally erupted into open warfare, with Ptolemy VIII and Cleopatra III on one side opposing Cleopatra II on the other. At first, Ptolemy retained control of Alexandria, but in late 131 BC the people of Alexandria rioted in favour of Cleopatra II and set fire to the royal palace. Ptolemy VIII, Cleopatra III, and their children escaped to Cyprus. Cleopatra II meanwhile had herself crowned as sole queen - the first time that a Ptolemaic woman had done this - and assumed the title of Thea Philomētōr Sōteira ("Mother-loving, Saviour Goddess"), which served to link her to her deceased husband Ptolemy VI and to the dynastic founder, Ptolemy I.

Although Alexandria had sided with Cleopatra II and she tended to be supported by Greeks and Jews throughout the country, Ptolemy VIII and Cleopatra III were more popular with the native Egyptian population. Most of Egypt continued to acknowledge Ptolemy VIII as king. In the south of the country, however, a man named Harsiesi took advantage of the chaos to rebel - following in the footsteps of the rebellion of Hugronaphor and Ankhmakis (206-185 BC). Harsiesi probably declared himself Pharaoh and managed to seize control of Thebes in August or September of 131 BC. He was expelled in November and pursued by Paos, the strategos of the Thebaid, who was also an Egyptian.

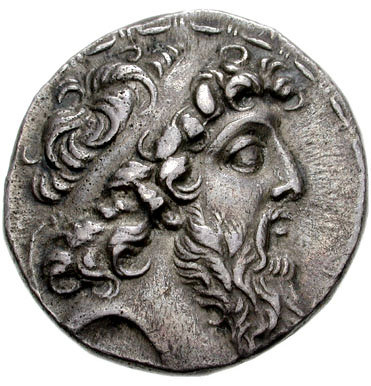
Coin of the Seleucid king Demetrius II

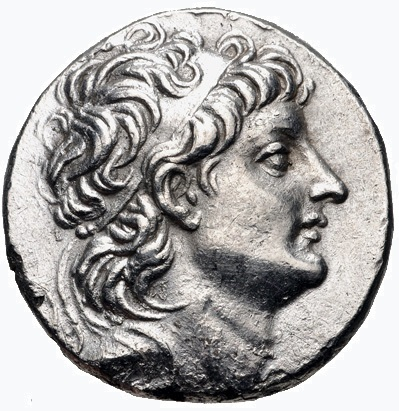
Coin of King Alexander II

Ptolemy VIII and Cleopatra III had returned from Cyprus to Egypt by the beginning of 130 BC. By spring, they were in charge of Memphis. Impressed by Paos' success against Harsiesi, they promoted him to command over the whole of Upper Egypt and put him in charge of the whole military apparatus - the first time that a native Egyptian had held such a prominent position. Harsiesi was finally captured and executed in September 130 BC. Alexandria was placed under siege but Ptolemy VIII and Cleopatra III were unable to capture it. Cleopatra II also maintained strongholds throughout the country – Harmonthis in the Thebaid was still under her control in October 130 BC. In the context of the struggle between Cleopatra II and Ptolemy VIII, the latter eliminated his two eldest sons: one was summoned from Cyrene (this was possibly the son of Cleopatra II by Ptolemy VI) and killed on the suspicion that the Alexandrians would make him king; the other, Ptolemy Memphites, the son of Cleopatra II by Ptolemy VIII, was about twelve years old, when his father killed him and sent the dismembered pieces back to Cleopatra II on her birthday. Both parties appealed to Rome, but the Senate did not intervene in the conflict.

Growing desperate, in 129 BC Cleopatra II offered the throne of Egypt to her son-in-law, the Seleucid king Demetrius II, who had just returned to power after years in Parthian captivity. Demetrius II launched an invasion of Egypt in 128 BC, but his forces were still in the eastern desert, besieging the border fortress of Pelusium, when news arrived that his wife, Cleopatra II's daughter Cleopatra Thea, had installed their son Antiochus VIII as king of Syria. The Seleucid troops mutinied and Demetrius II had to return to Syria. In order to prevent Demetrius II from returning once he had dealt with these revolts, Ptolemy VIII agreed to a request that he had received from a group of rebels in Syria, who had asked him to send them a royal pretender to lead them. Ptolemy VIII selected Alexander II, whom he presented as the son of an earlier Seleucid king, Alexander I (r. 152–145 BC). The resulting conflict in the Seleucid realm continued for years and meant that Seleucid intervention in opposition to Ptolemy VIII was no longer possible.

In 127 BC, Cleopatra II took her treasury and fled Alexandria for the court of Demetrius II. In her absence, Ptolemy VIII finally reconquered Alexandria. This reconquest was accompanied by a bloody purge of the supporters of Cleopatra II. It is difficult to tell whether various anecdotes recording the bloody slaughter that Ptolemy VIII presided over belong to this event or to the earlier purge of 145 BC.

== Third reign (127/126–116 BC) ==
After this, Ptolemy VIII began negotiations to reconcile with Cleopatra II and the Seleucid court. In 124 BC, Ptolemy VIII abandoned his support for Alexander II and agreed to support Demetrius II's son Antiochus VIII instead. He sealed the agreement by sending his second daughter by Cleopatra III, Tryphaena, to marry Antiochus VIII. Cleopatra II returned to Egypt from the Seleucid court and was once more acknowledged as co-regent with Ptolemy VIII and Cleopatra III. She appears along with them in papyrus documents from July 124 BC onwards.

The reconciliation of Ptolemy VIII and Cleopatra III with Cleopatra II was nevertheless a long process. To solidify their reconciliation and restore peace and prosperity to Egypt, the royal trio issued the Amnesty Decree in April 118 BC, which survives in a number of papyrus copies. This decree pardoned all crimes other than murder and temple robbing committed before 118 BC, encouraged refugees to return home and reclaim their property, waived all back-taxes, confirmed land grants made to soldiers during the civil war, affirmed temple land holdings and tax privileges, and instructed tax officials to use standardised weights and measures on pain of death. In addition, the decree established the jurisdiction of courts in legal disputes between Egyptians and Greeks. Henceforth, this would be determined by the language that the documents at the heart of the legal dispute were written in: the chrematistai (money-judges) would decide disputes over Greek documents, while the laokritai (folk-judges) would resolve disputes over Egyptian documents. The chrematistai were no longer allowed to drag Egyptians into their courts, as had apparently been occurring previously.

Ptolemy VIII died on 28 June 116 BC. He was succeeded by his eldest surviving son, Ptolemy IX, alongside Cleopatra II and Cleopatra III. Justin reports that he left the throne to Cleopatra III and whichever of her sons she preferred. Although she preferred her younger son, Ptolemy X, the people of Alexandria forced her to choose Ptolemy IX. This account is probably a false one, invented after Ptolemy IX was deposed by Ptolemy X.

== Regime ==
=== Ptolemaic dynastic cult ===
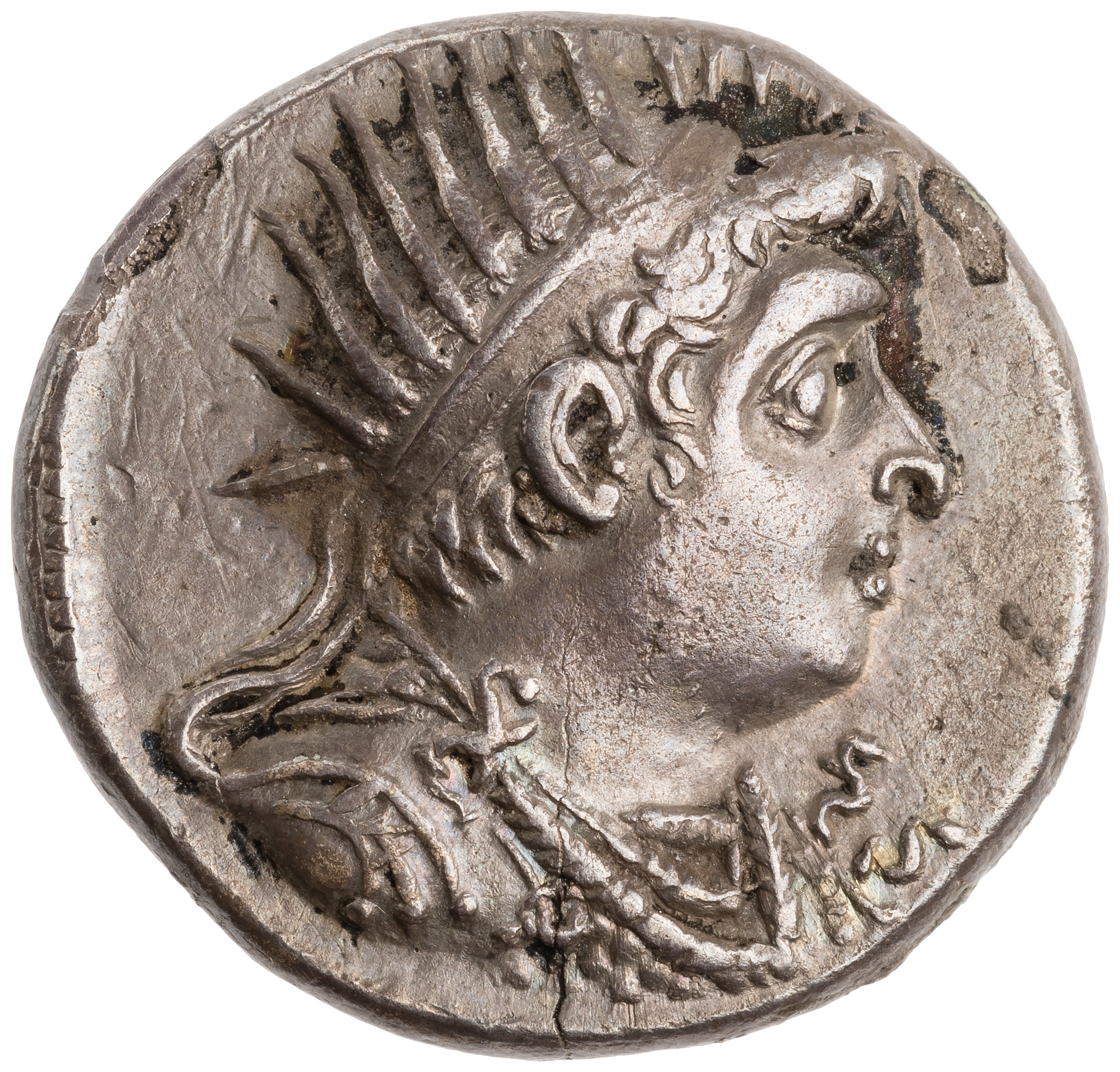
Didrachm with a portrait of Ptolemy VIII.

Ptolemaic Egypt had a dynastic cult, which centred on the Ptolemaia festival and the annual priest of Alexander the Great, whose full title included the names of all the Ptolemaic ruling couples and appeared in official documents as part of the date formula. In October 170 BC when Ptolemy VIII first became co-regent with his brother and sister, who were already worshipped as the Theoi Philomētores ("Mother-loving Gods"), he was simply added to their cult as a third "Mother-loving God". When he seized sole power in 164 BC, he seems to have assumed the new epithet Euergetēs ("Benefactor God"), but it is not clear what the implications of this were for the dynastic cult. After his expulsion from Alexandria in 163 BC, the Theoi Philomētores are attested once more.

At the start of his second reign in 145 BC, Ptolemy VIII was definitely incorporated into the dynastic cult, with him and Cleopatra II becoming the Theoi Euergetai ('Benefactor Gods'). Cleopatra III was added as a third Benefactor god in 142 or 141 BC, some time before she married Ptolemy VIII and was promoted to the status of co-regent. During the period of the civil war, Cleopatra II removed the Theoi Euergetai from the dynastic cult in Alexandria, but Ptolemy VIII and Cleopatra III maintained their own rival priest of Alexander from 130 BC until they recovered Alexandria in 127 BC. He is distinguished in documents as the 'Priest of Alexander... in the king's camp.' The situation before the civil war was restored in 124 BC after Ptolemy VIII reconciled with his sister, and it continued until Ptolemy VIII's death.

From May 118 BC, shortly after the final reconciliation of the royal trio, a new king was incorporated into the dynastic cult, Theos Neos Philopatōr ("New Father-loving God"). This was a posthumous cult for one of the princes killed by Ptolemy VIII, either Ptolemy, the son of Ptolemy VI and Cleopatra II, or Ptolemy Memphites, the son of Ptolemy VIII and Cleopatra II. In recent scholarship, Ptolemy Memphites is generally the preferred candidate, with his deification serving as an indication that the prince had posthumously reconciled with his father and murderer.

Since the death of Arsinoe II, deceased Ptolemaic queens had been honoured with a separate dynastic cult of their own, including a separate priestess who marched in religious processions in Alexandria behind the priest of Alexander the Great and whose names also appeared in dating formulae. In 131 or 130 BC, Ptolemy VIII and Cleopatra III took advantage of this tradition, in their conflict against Cleopatra II, by establishing a new priesthood in honour of Cleopatra III. This new position was called the 'Hieros Polos (sacred foal) of Isis, Great Mother of the Gods' and was placed immediately after the priest of Alexander and ahead of all the priestesses of the previous queens in the order of precedence. The position was unlike the previous priesthoods in that it was established for a living queen rather than a deceased one and because the holder was a priest rather than a priestess. The position is not attested after 105 BC.

=== Pharaonic ideology and traditional Egyptian religion ===
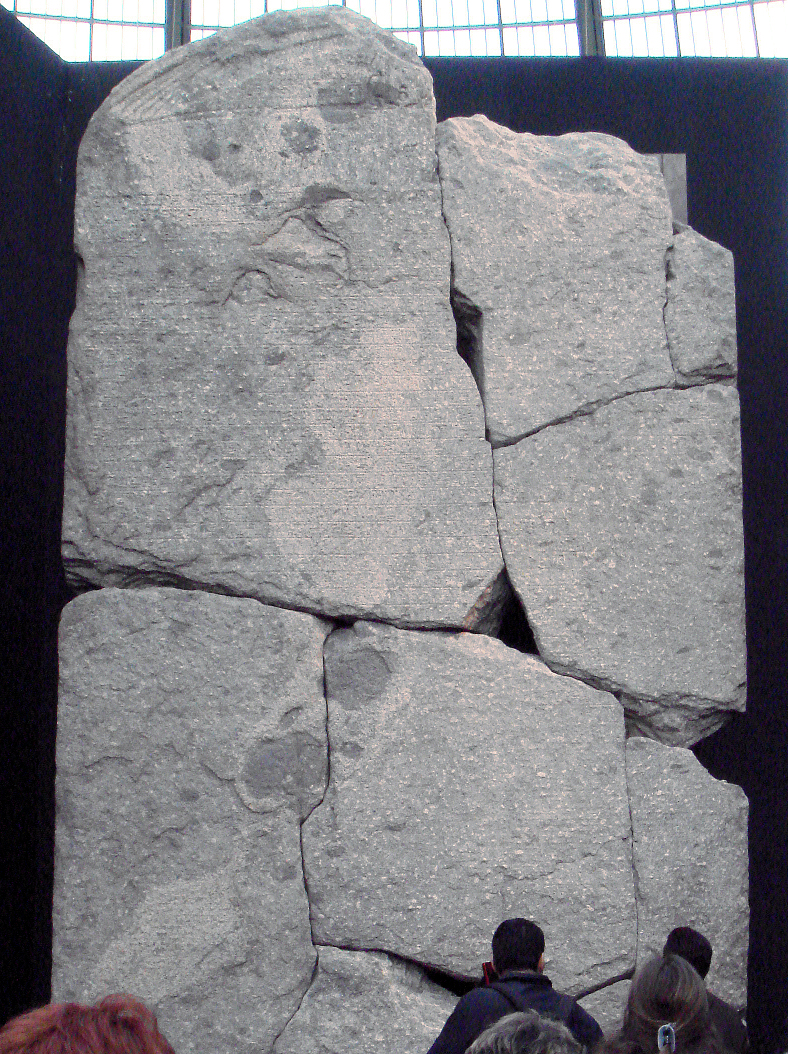
Stele attributed to Ptolemy VIII, glorifying his rule and describing his support of Egyptian gods. The stele was written in Egyptian hieroglyphs as well as Greek.

From the beginning of the Ptolemaic dynasty, the Ptolemies had taken on the traditional role of the Egyptian pharaoh and pursued a symbiotic alliance with the Egyptian priestly elite. The degree of investment of the Ptolemies in this aspect of their rulership steadily increased over the third and second centuries BC. Ptolemy VIII nevertheless represents a new stage in this process, since in the conflict with Cleopatra II he proved more popular among his Egyptian subjects than among his Greek ones.

In the Amnesty decree that announced the reconciliation of Ptolemy VIII, Cleopatra III, and Cleopatra II in 118 BC, the royal trio undertook to support reconstruction and repair work at temples throughout Egypt. They also promised to pay for the mummification and entombment of the Apis and Mnevis bulls.

=== Alexandrian Scholarship ===
Ptolemy VIII was an active participant in Greek scholarship, especially philology. He is reported to have written a study of Homer at some point before 145 BC and twenty-four books of Hypomnemata ('Notes'), a miscellaneous collection of paradoxography, including stories about historical and contemporary monarchs, as well as exotic wildlife, and other topics. The surviving fragments are collected in Felix Jacoby's Fragmente der griechischen Historiker

Despite this interest, Ptolemy VIII's reign saw a serious decline in the importance of Alexandria as an intellectual centre, in part due to the massacres that he carried out on taking control of the city in 145 BC and again in 126 BC. Among his victims on the first occasion were a number of prominent intellectuals, including Aristarchus of Samothrace and Apollodorus of Athens. The rest of the Alexandrian intellectuals appear to have been sent into exile, mostly relocating to Athens or Rhodes.

=== Indian Ocean trade ===
The Ptolemies had long retained a network of trading stations throughout the Red Sea, which enabled them to acquire gold, ivory, and elephants from the Horn of Africa. In the very last years of Ptolemy VIII's reign these sailors discovered that the annual reversal of the Indian Monsoon Current made it possible to cross the Indian Ocean by sea in summer and then return in winter. The first Greek to make this journey was Eudoxus of Cyzicus, who is reported to have travelled to India in 118 BC and again in 116 BC. The discovery opened up the possibility of direct seaborne trade with India. Previously, trade between the Mediterranean region and India had relied on intermediaries - sailors from the Arabian centres in the Gulf of Aden and the Persian Gulf and then desert caravans led by the Nabataeans to carry goods across the Arabian desert to the Mediterranean coast. Henceforth sailors from Ptolemaic Egypt began to make the full journey themselves. This marks the beginning of the Indian Ocean trade, which would become a major part of the Eurasian economic world system that operated from the first century BC until the fourth century AD.

== Marriages and issue ==
Ptolemy VIII married his older sister, Cleopatra II, on his accession in 145 BC. They had one son:

| Name | Image | Birth | Death | Notes |
|---|---|---|---|---|
| Ptolemy Memphites | | 144–142 BC | 130 BC | Murdered by his father in c. 130 BC; represented as king in the Temple of Edfu, but there is no evidence for functional co-regency with either of his parents. |

In 142 or 141 BC, Ptolemy VIII also married his niece Cleopatra III, daughter of Ptolemy VI and Cleopatra II. They had a number of children:

| Name | Image | Birth | Death | Notes |
|---|---|---|---|---|
| Ptolemy IX | | 142 BC | December 81 BC | Co-ruler of Egypt alongside his mother and grandmother from 116 to 107 BC, when he was exiled to Cyprus. He ruled Egypt once more from 88 to 81 BC. |
| Ptolemy X | | 140 BC? | 88-87 BC | King of Cyprus from 114 to 107 BC, when he became co-ruler of Egypt alongside his mother, until expelled in 88 BC |
| Tryphaena | | c. 140 BC | 110/09 BC | Married the Seleucid king Antiochus VIII |
| Cleopatra IV | | 138–135 BC? | 112 BC | Married to her brother Ptolemy IX and co-ruler with him from 116 to 115 BC, when she was divorced from him and remarried to the Seleucid king Antiochus IX |
| Cleopatra Selene | | 135–130 BC? | 69 BC | Married to Ptolemy IX from 115 BC until probably 107 BC, when she was possibly remarried to Ptolemy X. She then married in succession to three Seleucid kings: her sisters' widowers, Antiochus VIII and Antiochus IX, and then finally to her stepson (Antiochus IX's son), Antiochus X. Cleopatra Selene would eventually rule as queen of Syria in her own right. |

By a concubine, perhaps Eirene, Ptolemy VIII had further issue:

| Name | Image | Birth | Death | Notes |
|---|---|---|---|---|
| Ptolemy Apion | | | 96 BC | King of Cyrenaica from an uncertain date until 96 BC |

== Numbering ==
The numbering of the Ptolemaic kings, like any Hellenistic monarchs, is a modern scholarly convention; at most, ancient sources informally distinguished between like-named kings by their epithets or nicknames, and sometimes numbered those if they repeated: thus, our Ptolemy VIII Euergetes is "[Ptolemy] Euergetes II" in the Canon of Ptolemy. Trying to synchronize the testimony of the narrative sources and epigraphic evidence, and misled by the appearance of additional royal names in the lists of deified Ptolemies, modern scholarship at one time numbered Ptolemy Eupator as a predecessor of Ptolemy VI Philometor (making the latter "Ptolemy VII Philometor") and Ptolemy Neos Philopator as a predecessor of Ptolemy VIII Euergetes (making the latter "Ptolemy IX Euergetes"). Once it was determined that the listing in the dynastic cult reflected the order of death and deification, not reign, and that Ptolemy Eupator was a son and co-regent of Ptolemy VI Philometor who never became sole or senior monarch, he ceased to be numbered, leaving his father as "Ptolemy VI Philometor" (making his uncle "Ptolemy VIII Euergetes"). However, it was only recently established that Ptolemy Neos Philopator was never sole or senior monarch (and probably never even co-regent); even if identified with the surviving son of Ptolemy VI Philometor (current research favors Ptolemy Memphites, son of Ptolemy VIII Euergetes, instead), and even if he had reigned in 145 BC (which he did not), since Ptolemy VIII Euergetes became king as co-regent (in 170 BC) and as sole monarch (in 164 BC) long before any of his nephews and sons, he would be "Ptolemy VII Euergetes". However, to avoid causing confusion with a large body of accumulated literature already labeling him "Ptolemy VIII Euergetes", most scholars have continued to refer to him with that numbering. Nevertheless, Ptolemy VIII Euergetes sometimes appears, correctly but potentially confusingly, as "Ptolemy VII Euergetes". To avoid potential confusion, it is recommended to append the epithet and/or nickname of Ptolemaic kings to their names in addition to the numbering.

== Gallery ==
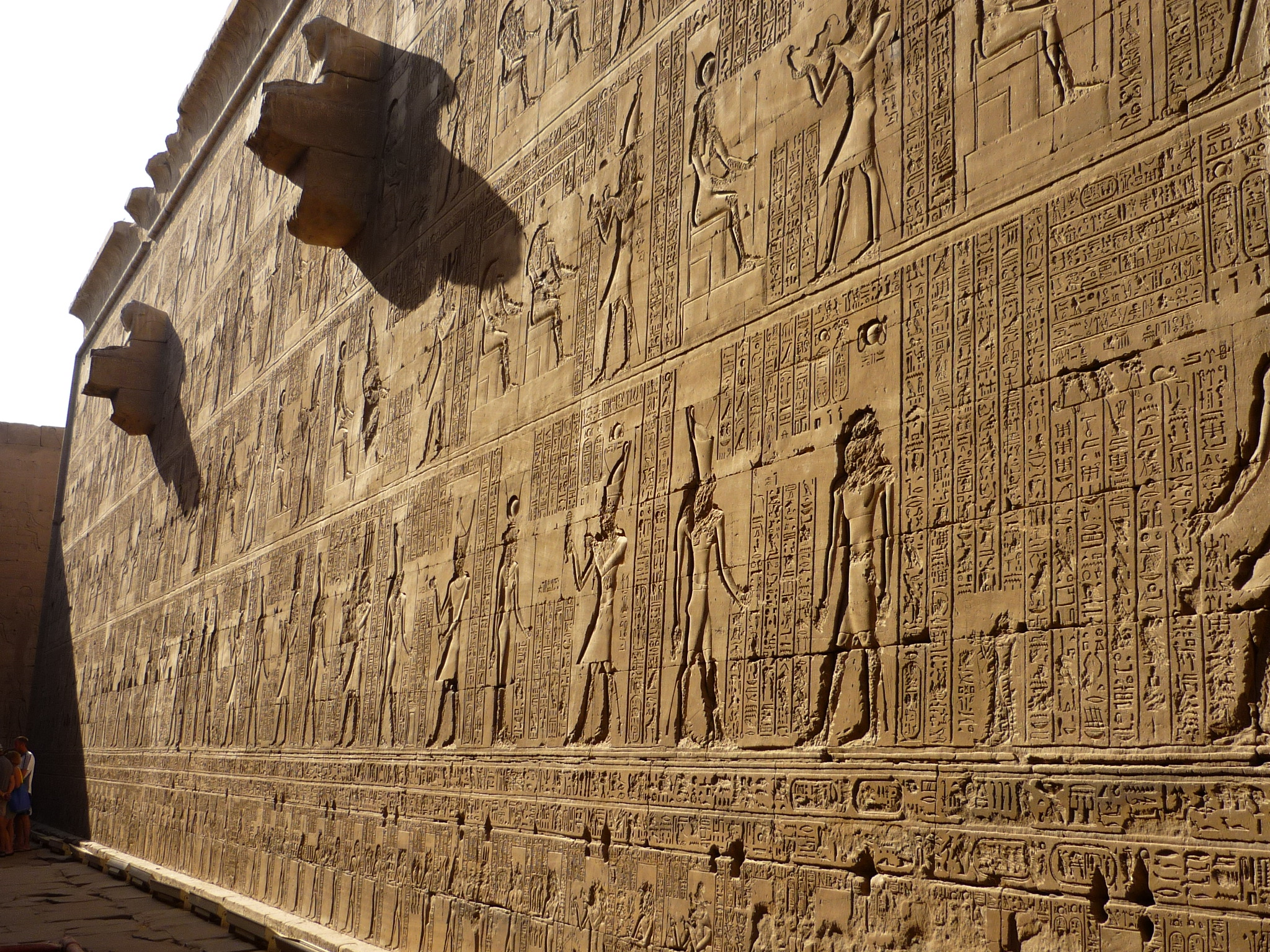
Nord ambulatory, temple Edfu

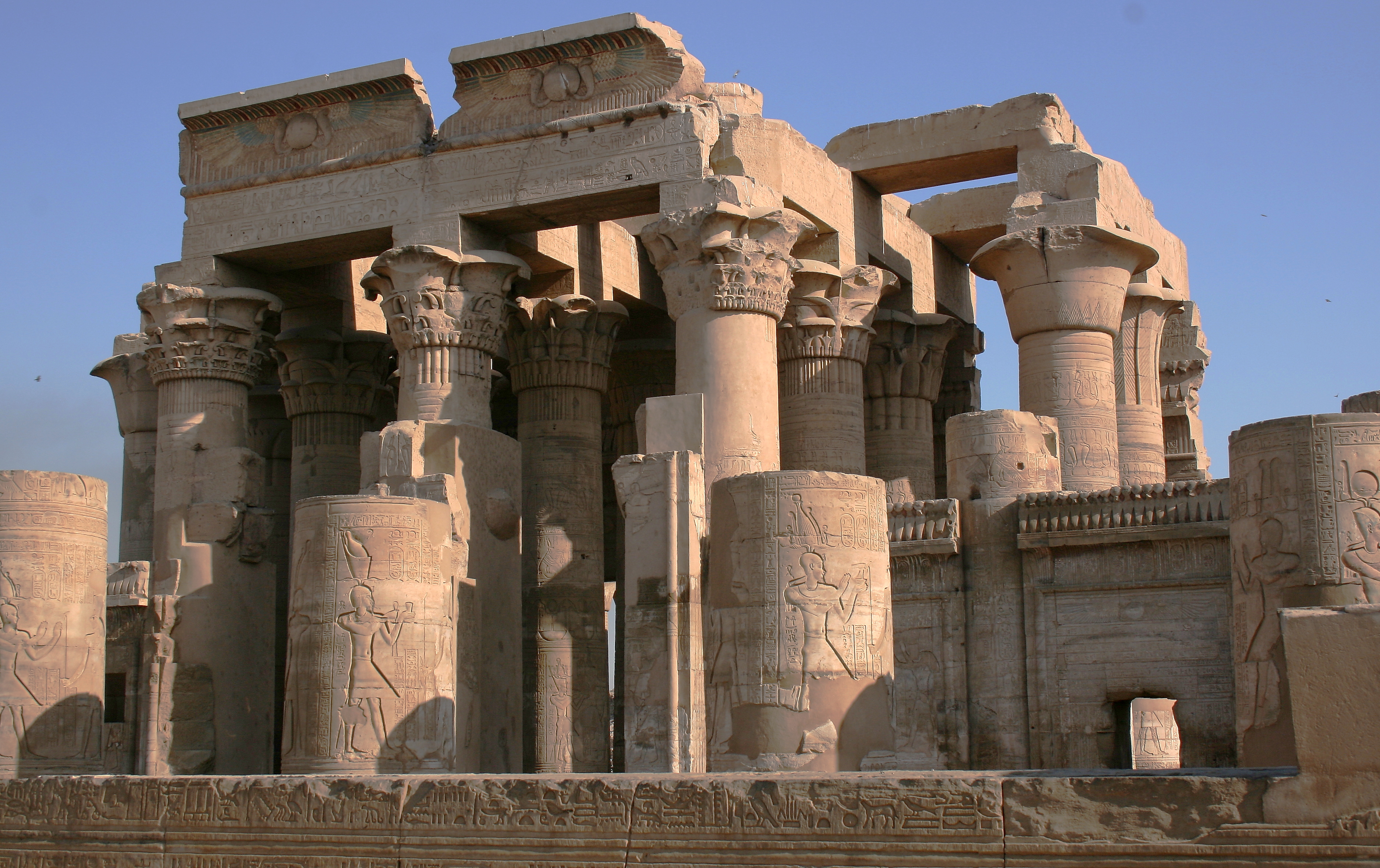
Temple Kom-Ombo

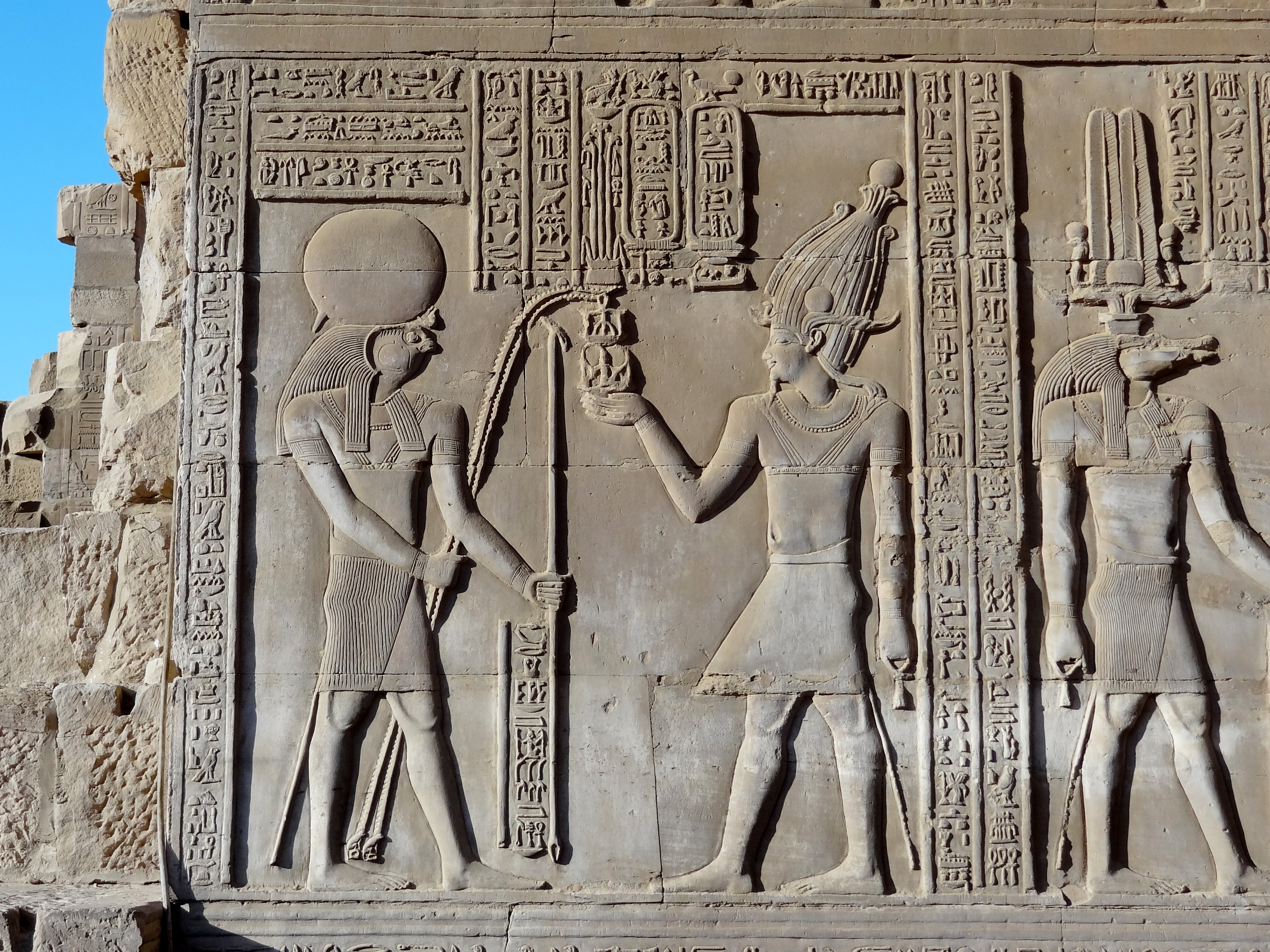
Ptolemy VIII between Re-Horkhty and Sobek. Relief in the Temple of Kom Ombo

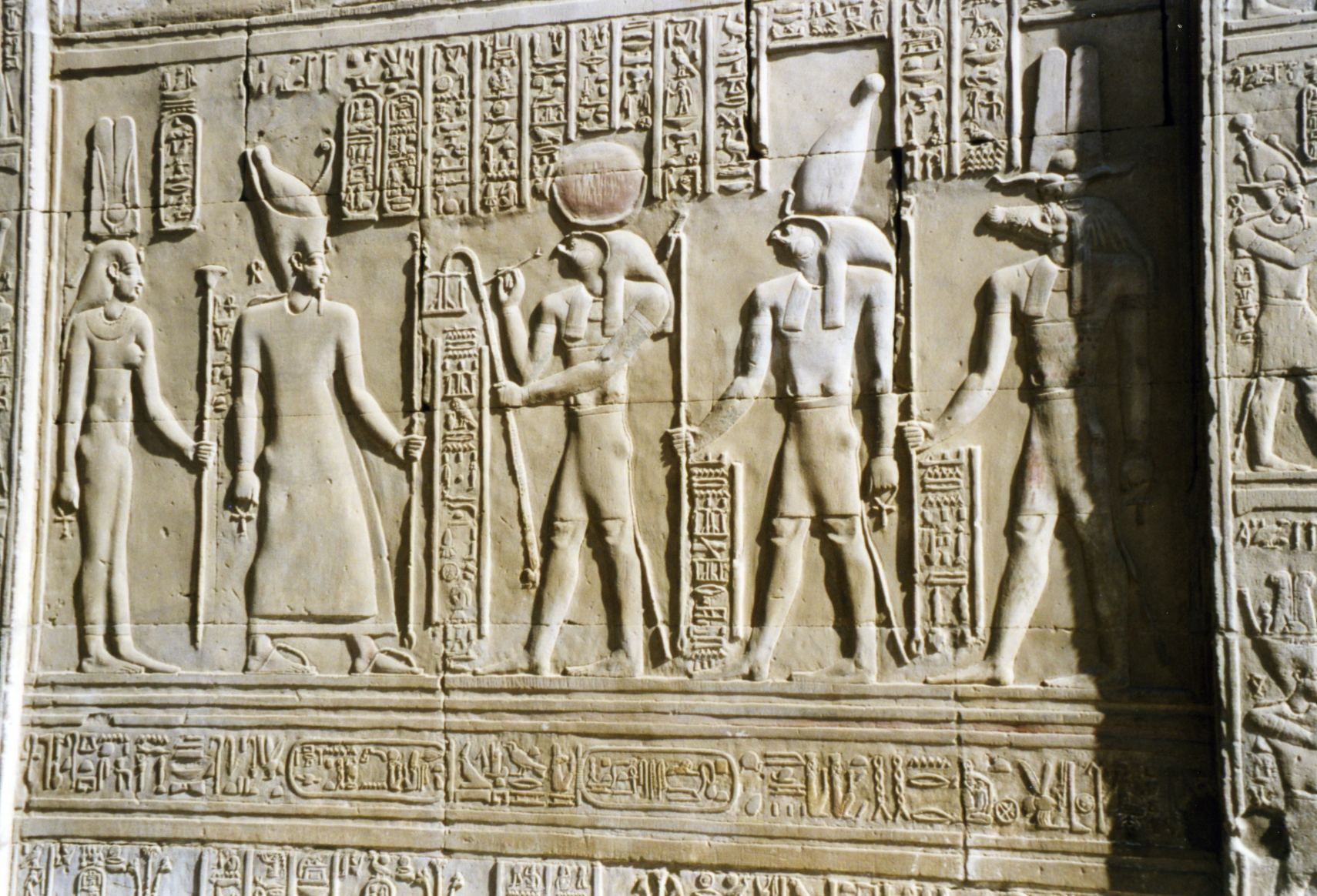
Ptolemy VIII and his wife Cleopatra II facing the gods Re-Horkhty Horus and Sobek

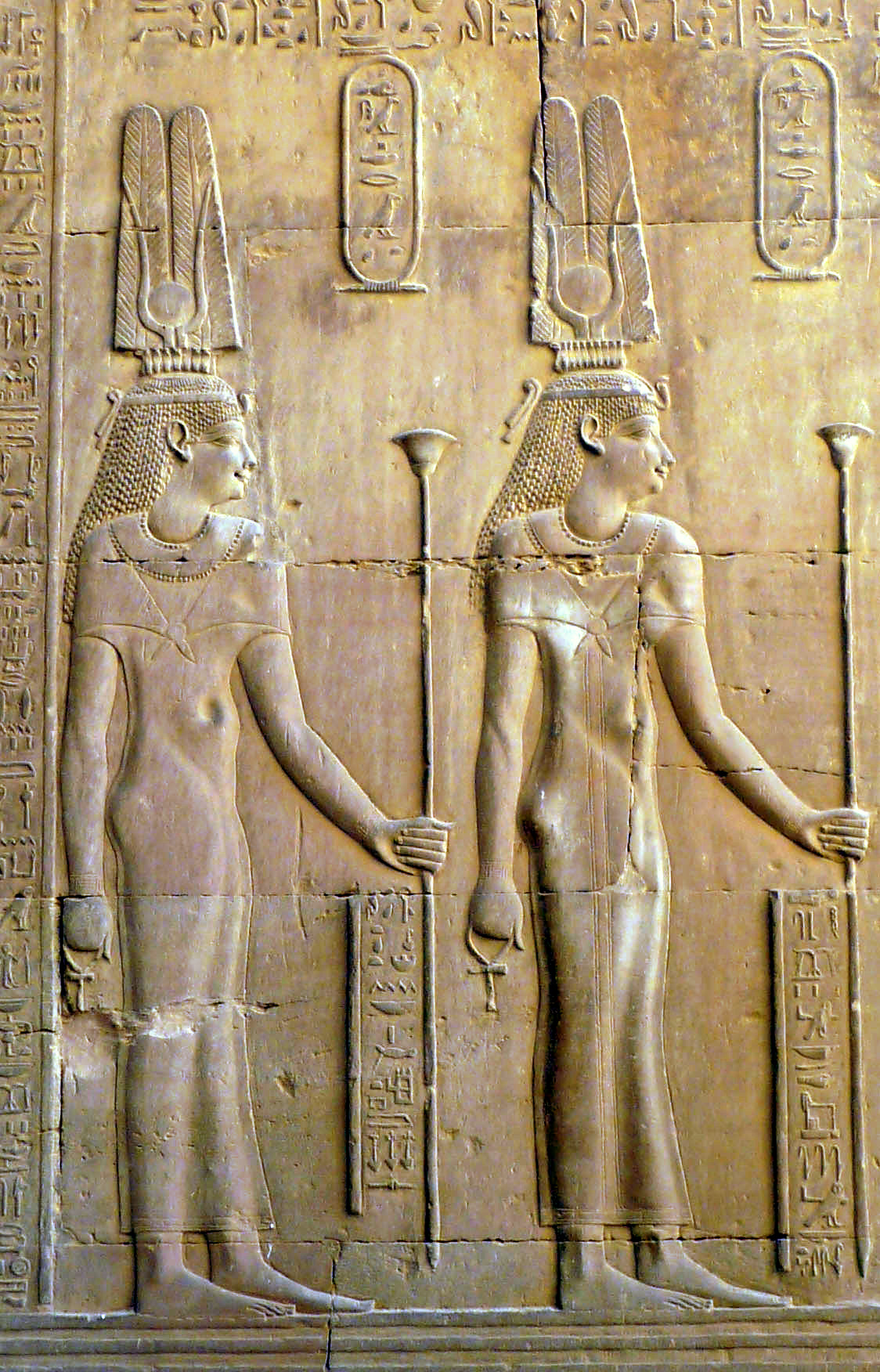
Cleopatra II and Cleopatra III, Kom Ombo

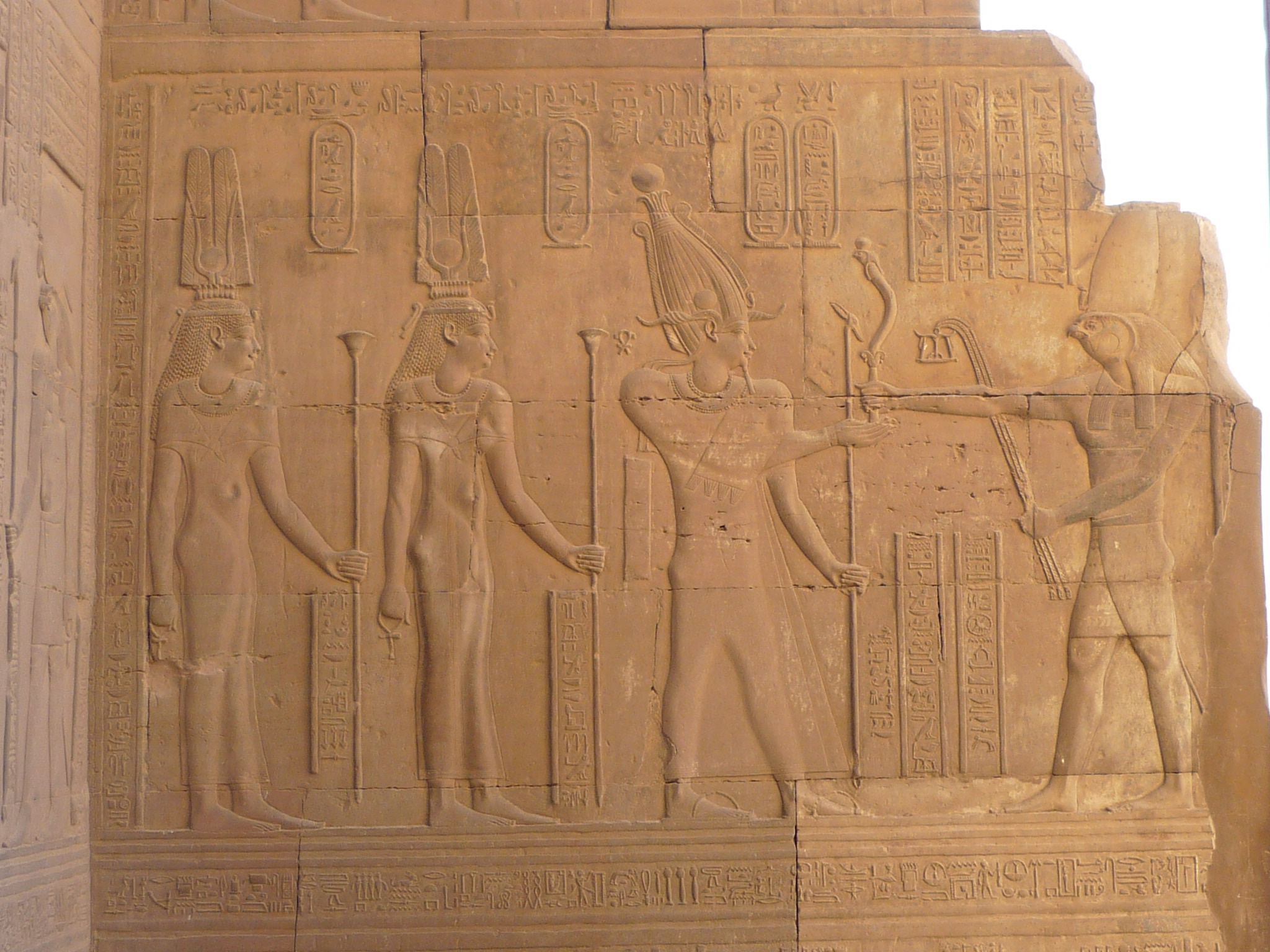
Wall relief of Cleopatra III, Cleopatra II and Ptolemy VIII before Horus

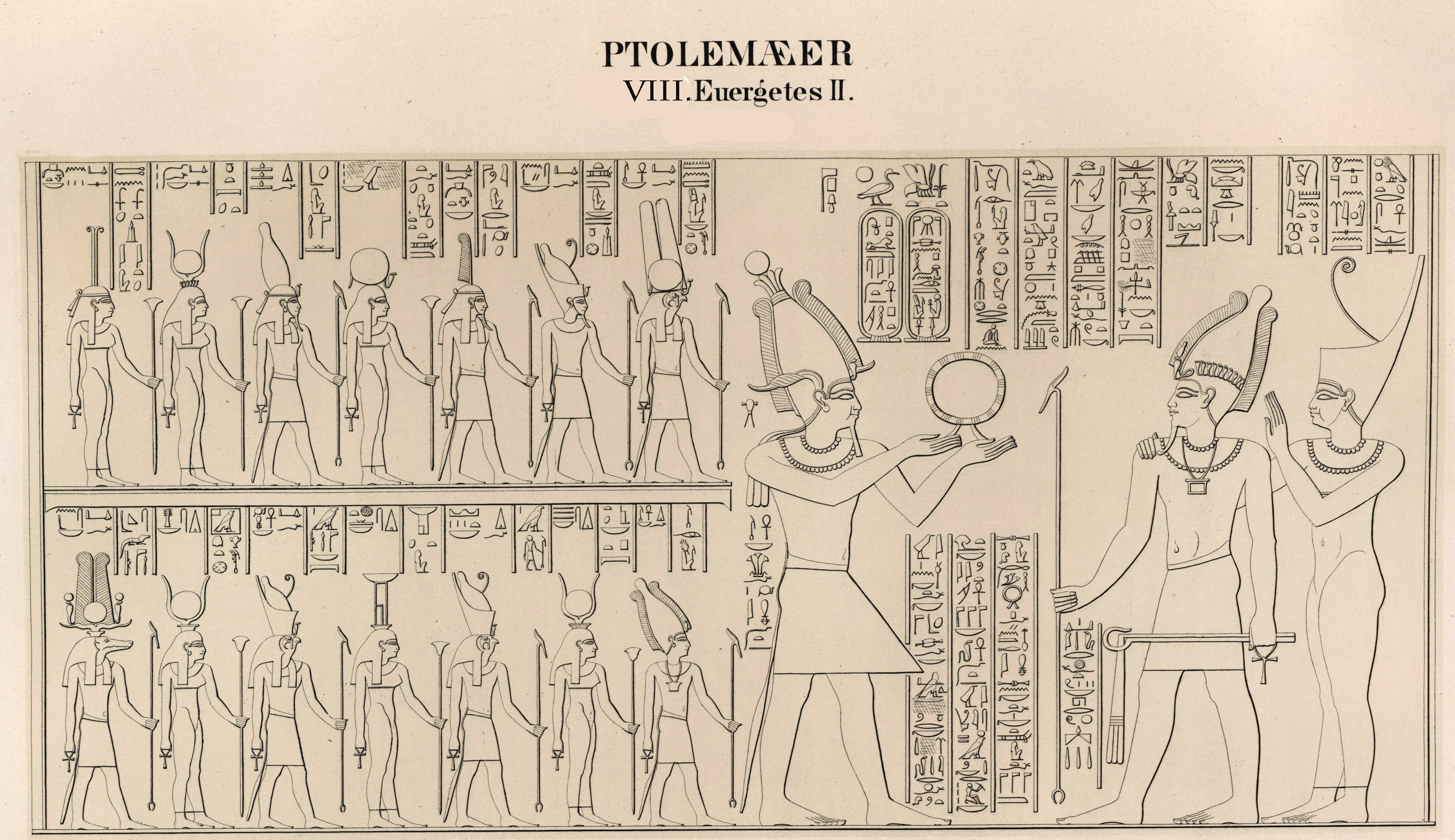
Ptolemy VIII. and a pantheon of gods before Amun and goddess Mut

== Bibliography ==
- Beckerath, J. von, Handbuch der ägyptischen Königsnamen, Mainz, 1999.
- Bickerman, E. J., Chronology of the Ancient World, 2nd rev. ed., London, 1980.
- Bielman, A., "Stéréotypes et réalités du pouvoir politique féminin: la guerre civile en Égypte entre 132 et 124 av. J.-C.," EuGeStA 7 (2017) 84–114.
- Cauville, S., and D. Devauchelle, "Le temple d'Edfou: étapes de la construction nouvelles données historiques," Revue d'Égyptologie 35 (1984) 31–55.
- Chassinat, E., Le Temple d'Edfou 4, Cairo, 1929.
- Chauveau, M., "Encore Ptolémée «VII» et le dieu Neos Philopatôr!," Revue d’Égyptologie 51 (2000) 257-261.
- Chrubasik, Boris (2016). Kings and Usurpers in the Seleukid Empire: The Men who would be King. Oxford: Oxford University Press. ISBN 9780198786924.
- Errington, R. M., A History of the Hellenistic World 323-30 BC, Malden, MA, 2008.
- Grainger, John D. (2010). The Syrian Wars. Brill. pp. 281–328. ISBN 9789004180505.
- Peter Green, Alexander to Actium (University of California Press, 1990) ISBN 0-520-05611-6
- Hölbl, Günther (2001). A History of the Ptolemaic Empire. London & New York: Routledge. pp. 143–152 & 181–194. ISBN 0415201454.
- Peter Nadig, Zwischen König und Karikatur: Das Bild Ptolemaios’ VIII. im Spannungsfeld der Überlieferung (C.H. Beck, 2007) ISBN 978-3-406-55949-5
- Toomer, G. J., Ptolemy's Almagest, Princeton, NJ, 1998.

Ptolemy VIII Physcon Ptolemaic Dynasty Born: 182 BC Died: 116 BC
| Preceded by Ptolemy VI and Cleopatra II | Pharaoh of Egypt; 169–164 BC; With: Ptolemy VI and Cleopatra II | Succeeded by Ptolemy VI and Cleopatra II |
| Preceded by Ptolemy VI and Cleopatra II | Pharaoh of Egypt; 144–132/131 BC; With: Cleopatra II and Cleopatra III | Succeeded by Cleopatra II |
| Preceded by Cleopatra II | Pharaoh of Egypt; 126–116 BC; With: Cleopatra II and Cleopatra III | Succeeded by Cleopatra II, Cleopatra III and Ptolemy IX |
