= Lucius Cornelius Balbus =

Lucius Cornelius Balbus may refer to:

- Lucius Cornelius Balbus (consul), Roman consul and friend of Julius Caesar
- Lucius Cornelius Balbus the Younger, nephew of L. Cornelius Balbus Maior
