= Gnaeus Cornelius Dolabella (disambiguation) =

Gnaeus Cornelius Dolabella may refer to:

- Gnaeus Cornelius Dolabella, Roman consul in 81 BC
- Gnaeus Cornelius Dolabella (consul 159 BC), Roman politician
- Gnaeus Cornelius Dolabella (praetor 81 BC), Roman nobleman and praetor urbanus in 81 BC

== See also ==
- Cornelius Dolabella (disambiguation)
