= Lucius Cornelius Merula =

Lucius Cornelius Merula may refer to

- Lucius Cornelius Merula (consul 193 BC), politician and general of the 2nd century BC
- Lucius Cornelius Merula (consul 87 BC), politician of the 1st century BC
