= Lucius Cornelius Lentulus =

Lucius Cornelius Lentulus may refer to:

- Lucius Cornelius Lentulus (consul 199 BC)
- Lucius Cornelius Lentulus Lupus (consul 156 BC)
- Lucius Cornelius Lentulus (consul 130 BC)
- Lucius Cornelius Lentulus Crus, consul in 49 BC
- Lucius Cornelius Lentulus Cruscellio, suffect consul in 38 BC
- Lucius Cornelius Lentulus (consul 3 BC)
