= Gnaeus Cornelius Lentulus =

Gnaeus Cornelius Lentulus is the name of several ancient Romans, including:

- Gnaeus Cornelius Lentulus (consul 146 BC)
- Gnaeus Cornelius Lentulus (consul 97 BC), son of the above
- Gnaeus Cornelius Lentulus Clodianus, consul in 72 BC who was defeated by Spartacus
- Gnaeus Cornelius Lentulus Marcellinus, consul in 56 BC
- Gnaeus Cornelius Lentulus Augur, consul in 14 BC
- Gnaeus Cornelius Lentulus Gaetulicus (consul 26), consul in 26 AD
- Gnaeus Cornelius Lentulus Gaetulicus (consul 55)
