= Titus Manlius Torquatus (consul 165 BC) =

Roman consul in 165 BC

Titus Manlius Torquatus (born before 208 – died after 133 BC) was a politician of the Roman Republic, who became consul in 165 BC. Born into a prominent family, he sought to emulate the legendary severity of his ancestors, notably by forcing his son to commit suicide after he had been accused of corruption. Titus had a long career and was a respected jurist. He was also active in diplomatic affairs; he notably served as ambassador to Egypt in 162 BC in a mission to support the claims of Ptolemy VIII Physcon over Cyprus.

== Family background ==
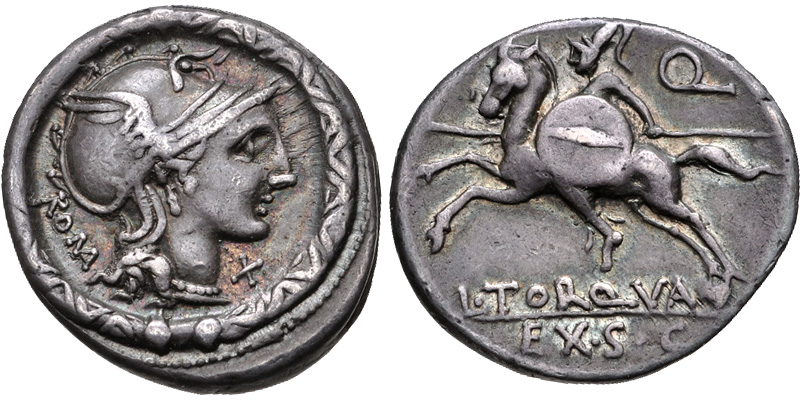
Denarius of Lucius Manlius Torquatus, Titus' grandson, 113–112 BC. The obverse depicts the head of Roma within a torque, the emblem of the Manlii Torquati. The reverse depicts a warrior charging into battle on horseback, beneath the letter 'Q', signifying Torquatus' quaestorship.

Titus was born before 208 in the patrician gens Manlia, one of the most important gentes of the Republic. Members of the family had held the consulship 18 times and consular tribuneship 14 times before him. His father Aulus was killed in 208 BC alongside the great Claudius Marcellus during the Second Punic War at an early age. However his grandfather Titus was twice consul in 235 and 224, censor in 231, and dictator in 208. He was known for his severity, notably by refusing to ransom the Roman soldiers captured by Hannibal after the Battle of Cannae, and by abruptly rejecting the admission of Latin allies in the Senate.

Titus had a younger brother named Aulus, who was also consul in 164. Although in the Roman naming convention the eldest son traditionally received his father's first name, Aulus in this case, Titus was given the name of his grandfather.

The cognomen Torquatus was first received by Titus' ancestor Titus Manlius Imperiosus in 361 after he had defeated a Gaul in single combat, and took his torque as a trophy. The torque then became the emblem of the family, whose members proudly put it on the coins they minted. Imperiosus Torquatus too was famous for his strictness; known for killing his own son after he had disobeyed him during a battle.

== Career ==
Titus' career is not known before his consulship, but the German historian Friedrich Münzer suggested that he was praetor in 170, a year with a lacuna in the manuscript of Livy. The same year he became member of the College of Pontiffs—a religious position—which his grandfather had also held. He was furthermore an eminent jurist in civil and religious law, although he did not write books.

He was elected consul in 165, together with Gnaeus Octavius. Titus is described as consul posterior by Livy, which means the Centuriate Assembly elected him after Octavius. However, in the Fasti Capitolini—the list of consuls made under Augustus—Titus is promoted to the first place, probably because his great-great-grandson was a member of the College of Pontiffs, which was tasked with establishing the Fasti. Around this time, the emperor Augustus was also trying to revive several distinguished patrician houses and therefore supported their enhancement in the Fasti. Titus' colleague Octavius was not a direct ancestor of Augustus, although from the same gens. Despite being a homo novus, Octavius was already famous by the time of his election, as he had led the Roman navy during the Third Macedonian War, for which he was awarded a triumph in 167.

Unfortunately, Titus' and Octavius' policies as consuls are completely unknown because the manuscript of Livy abruptly ends just before the account of their consulship. No other ancient author mentions their deeds, although Obsequens says that they had to handle a plague epidemic at Rome. Titus most likely used his consulship to secure the election of his brother the following year.

After his consulship, Titus was involved in diplomatic affairs. He is mentioned as legate to Syria in 164 in a letter to the Jews approving the concessions made by the Seleucid regent Lysias to the Jews. However this letter—reproduced in 2 Maccabees—has been considered apocryphal as it is dated according to the Seleucid era and no Roman source supports this event. Münzer rejects the identification with the consul of 165, but mentions it could be his son, praetor in the 130s.

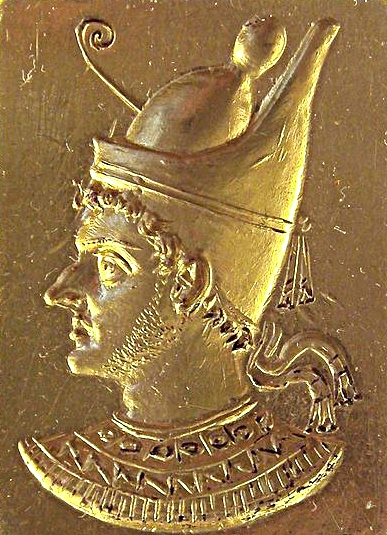
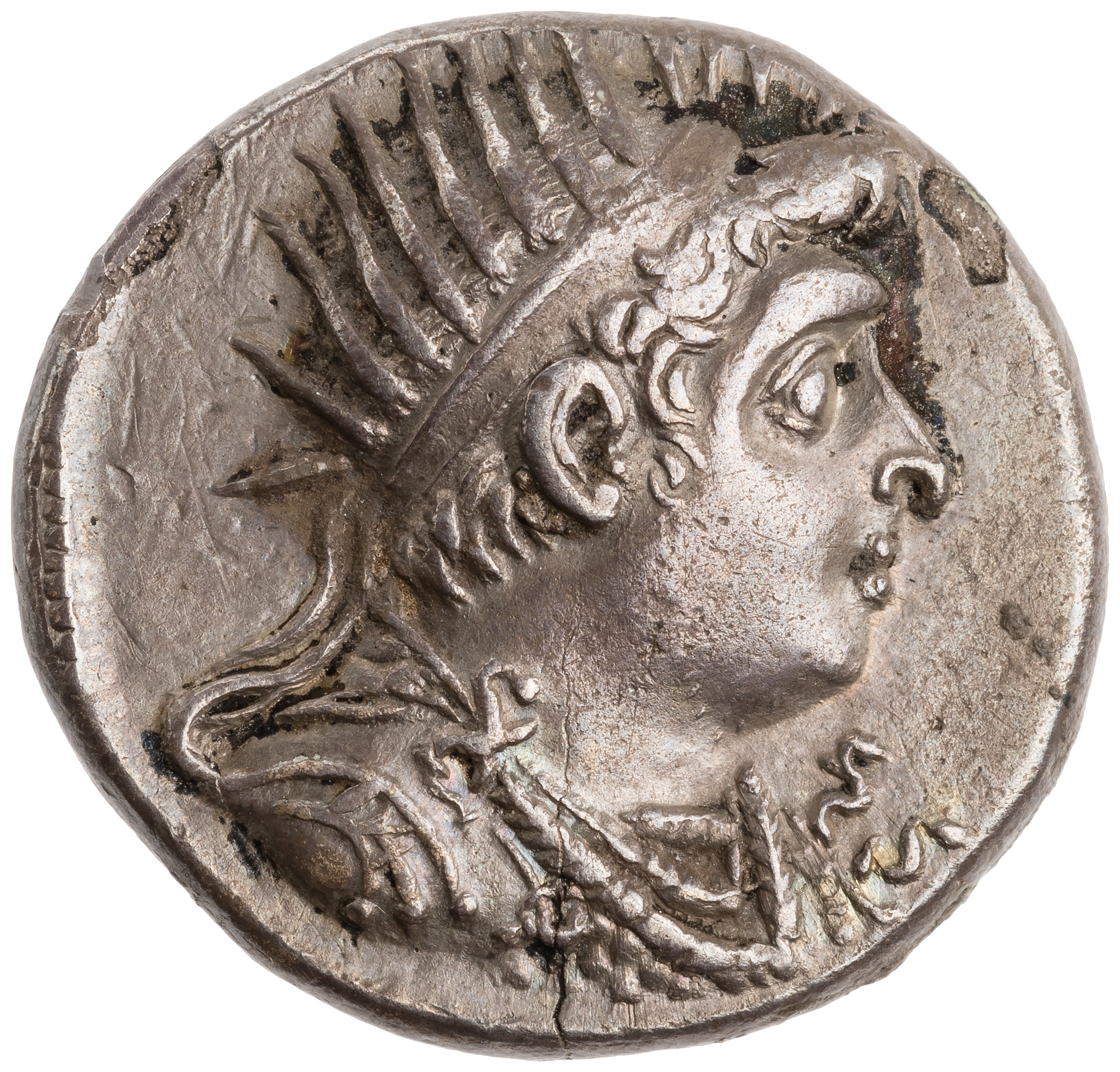
The enemy brothers: ring with engraved portrait of Ptolemy VI Philometor (left), didrachm of Ptolemy VIII Physcon (right).

In 162, Ptolemy VIII Physcon travelled to Rome to challenge the partition of the Ptolemaic Kingdom with his older brother Ptolemy VI Philometor, and asked the Senate to support his claim on Cyprus. The Senate agreed and sent as legates to Cyprus Gnaeus Cornelius Merula and Titus Torquatus, with the mission to support Physcon's claim on the island, while preventing a war between the brothers. Polybius thought that the Romans wanted to avoid the threat of a unified Ptolemaic Kingdom, and therefore supported the claims of Physcon. In Rhodes, Titus successfully convinced Physcon to abandon his project of conquering Cyprus, so he could instead go to Alexandria in order to negotiate a peaceful settlement with Philometor. However, Cyrenaica—under Physcon's control—rebelled just after Titus had left the younger Ptolemy. It prompted Physcon's return to Africa to quell the revolt and the end of the talks between Titus and the elder Ptolemy. The embassy thus ended in a failure. At their return to Rome, Titus and Merula spoke in favour of Physcon in the Senate, which resulted in the expulsion of Philometor's envoys.

In 161, Titus drafted the senatus consultum about a territorial dispute between the two Greek cities of Magnesia and Priene in Asia. The inscription was initially read "Mallius" and dated 143, but modern historians have suggested it should read Manlius with the earlier date, although only Walbank makes the connection with the consul of 165.

Titus may have still been alive in 133, as Plutarch reports that the tribune of the plebs Tiberius Sempronius Gracchus was supplicated by two respected ex-consuls—"Manlius and Fulvius"—to settle his dispute with the other tribune Marcus Octavius in the Senate. Tiberius consented out of respect for them, but the session of the senate achieved nothing. There were several consular Fulvii alive, but only one Manlius, the consul of 165. However, the manuscript of Plutarch could read as Manilius, in which case it would refer to Manius Manilius, consul in 149.

After the two consulships of Titus and his brother Aulus, the Torquati suffered from a period of obscurity, and had to wait a century until another member of the family became consul again.

== Trial of his son (140 BC) ==
Titus had at least two sons, the elder was named Titus. He was praetor circa 136, but his career was cut short by his defeat against Eunus during the First Servile War. The second son was given for adoption to Decimus Junius Silanus, a respected senator known for having translated the work of Mago on agriculture in Latin. This second son therefore took the name of his adoptive father and became Decimus Junius Silanus Manlianus. It is the first recorded instance of a patrician adopted into a plebeian family.

Manlianus was praetor in Macedonia in 141, or perhaps 142. After he had been accused of corruption by Macedonian envoys, Titus—his natural father—requested from the Senate the authorisation to judge his son privately in his house before the inquiry could take place. Since Titus was a law expert and a senior consular, both the senate and the Macedonian delegation allowed him to do so. After a three-day trial, he found his son guilty and banished him from his sight. The sentence was not legally binding, but the code of honour of the family compelled Manlianus to hang himself the following night. Titus refused to attend his son's funerals, and ostensibly showed his disinterest when the funeral procession passed by. Valerius Maximus notes that the death mask of Imperiosus Torquatus—who had killed his son—was prominently displayed in Titus' house and inspired his severity towards his own son. The case took place in the aftermath of the Lex Calpurnia (passed in 149), which organised the prosecution of Roman governors for extortion during their tenure, but its resolution through a private court is possibly unique in Roman history.

In order to erase the memory of his son, Titus might have had a third son at an old age, named Aulus. This hypothetical son could have been the father of Aulus Manlius Torquatus, praetor in 70.

== Stemma of the Manlii Torquati ==
Stemma taken from Münzer until "A. Manlius Torquatus, d. 208", and then Mitchell, with corrections. All dates are BC.

Legend
Orange	Dictator	Yellow	Censor	Green	Consul

T. Manlius; Imperiosus Torquatus dict. 353, 349, 320 cos. 347, 344, 340
T. Manlius Torquatus d. 340
T. Manlius Torquatus cos. 299	L. Manlius Torquatus legate 295
T. Manlius Torquatus
T. Manlius Torquatus	A. Manlius Torquatus; Atticus cens. 247; cos. 244, 241
T. Manlius Torquatus cos. 235, 224 cens. 231; dict. 208
A. Manlius Torquatus d. 208
T. Manlius Torquatus cos. 165	A. Manlius Torquatus cos. 164
T. Manlius Torquatus pr. 137	D. Junius; Silanus Manlianus pr. 141, d. 140
T. Manlius Torquatus	L. Manlius Torquatus qu. circa 113	A. Manlius Torquatus
T. Manlius Torquatus pr. 69	P. Cornelius; Lentulus Spinther (adopted) augur 57	Manlia	L. Manlius Torquatus cos. 65	A. Manlius Torquatus pr. 70
L. Manlius Torquatus pr. 49	A. Manlius Torquatus qu. 43, pontifex	A. Manlius Torquatus	T. Manlius Torquatus

== Bibliography ==
=== Ancient works ===
- 2 Maccabees.
- Marcus Tullius Cicero, De Finibus.
- Titus Livius (Livy), History of Rome, Periochae.
- Julius Obsequens, Liber Prodigiorum.
- Gaius Plinius Secundus (Pliny the Elder), Naturalis Historia (Natural History).
- Plutarch, Parallel lives.
- Polybius, Historiae (The Histories).
- Publius Cornelius Tacitus, Annales.
- Valerius Maximus, Factorum ac Dictorum Memorabilium (Memorable Deeds and Sayings).

=== Modern works ===
- Michael C. Alexander, Trials in the Late Roman Republic, 149 to 50 BC, University of Toronto Press, 1990.
- A. E. Astin, Scipio Aemilianus, Oxford University Press, 1968.
- John R. Bartlett, The Cambridge Bible Commentary, The First and Second Books of the Maccabees, Cambridge University Press, 1973.
- T. Corey Brennan, The Praetorship in the Roman Republic, Oxford University Press, 2000.
- T. Robert S. Broughton, The Magistrates of the Roman Republic, American Philological Association, 1952.
- ——, Supplement to The Magistrates of the Roman Republic, American Philological Association, 1960.
- Robert Henry Charles, The Apocrypha and Pseudepigrapha of the Old Testament in English, volume I, Apocrypha, Oxford University Press, 1913.
- Michael Crawford, Roman Republican Coinage, Cambridge University Press (1974–2001).
- Wilhelm Dittenberger, Sylloge Inscriptionum Graecarum (Collection of Greek Inscriptions, abbreviated SIG), Leipzig, 1883.
- Harriet Isabel Flower, Ancestor Masks and Aristocratic Power in Roman Culture, Oxford University Press, 1996.
- Erich S. Gruen, Roman Politics and the Criminal Courts, 149–78 B.C., Harvard University Press, 1968.
- Günther Höbl, A History of the Ptolemaic Empire, London & New York, Routledge, 2001 (originally published in 1994, translated by Tina Saavedra).
- Allan Chester Johnson, Paul Robinson Coleman-Norton, Frank Card Bourne, Ancient Roman Statutes, Clark NJ, Lawbook Exchange, 2003.
- Wolfgang Kunkel, Herkunft und soziale Stellung der römischen Juristen, Weimar, Hermann Böhlaus Nachfolger, 1952.
- David Magie, Roman Rule in Asia Minor, Princeton University Press, 1950.
- Jane F. Mitchell, "The Torquati", in Historia: Zeitschrift für Alte Geschichte, vol. 15, part 1, (January 1966), pp. 23–31.
- M. Gwyn Morgan, "'Cornelius and the Pannonians': Appian, Illyrica 14, 41 and Roman History, 143-138 B.C.", in Historia: Zeitschrift für Alte Geschichte, vol. 23, part 2 (2nd Qtr., 1974), pp. 183–216.
- Friedrich Münzer, Roman Aristocratic Parties and Families, translated by Thérèse Ridley, Johns Hopkins University Press, 1999 (originally published in 1920).
- August Pauly, Georg Wissowa, et alii, Realencyclopädie der Classischen Altertumswissenschaft (abbreviated PW), J. B. Metzler, Stuttgart (1894–1980).
- Francis X. Ryan, Rank and Participation in the Republican Senate, Stuttgart, Franz Steiner Verlag, 1998.
- Robert K. Sherk, Translated Documents of Greece and Rome, vol. 4, Rome and the Greek East to the death of Augustus, Cambridge University Press, 1984.
- Ioannis Svoronos, Ta nomismata tou kratous ton Ptolemaion, Athens, 1904.
- Ronald Syme, Roman Papers, edited by Ernst Badian and Anthony R. Birley, 7 volumes, Oxford, 1979–1991.
- ——, The Augustan Aristocracy, Oxford University Press, 1986.
- Lily Ross Taylor and T. Robert S. Broughton, "The Order of the Two Consuls' Names in the Yearly Lists", Memoirs of the American Academy in Rome, 19 (1949), pp. 3–14.
- ——, "New Indications of Augustan Editing in the Capitoline Fasti", Classical Philology, Vol. 46, No. 2 (Apr., 1951), pp. 73–80.
- —— and T. Robert S. Broughton, "The Order of the Consuls' Names in Official Republican Lists", Historia: Zeitschrift für Alte Geschichte, vol. 17, part 2 (Apr., 1968), pp. 166–172.
- ——, The Voting Districts of the Roman Republic, University of Michigan Press, 1960.
- Frank William Walbank, A Commentary on Polybius, Oxford University Press, 1979.

Preceded by Marcus Claudius Marcellus and Gaius Sulpicius Galus	Consul of the Roman Republic with Gnaeus Octavius; 165 BC	Succeeded by Quintus Cassius Longinus and Aulus Manlius Torquatus
