= Lucius Cornelius Cinna (disambiguation) =

Lucius Cornelius Cinna was consul four times from 87 to 84 BC.

Lucius Cornelius Cinna may also refer to:

- Lucius Cornelius Cinna (consul 127 BC),
- Lucius Cornelius Cinna (praetor 44 BC), and
- Lucius Cornelius Cinna (suffect consul 32 BC)
