= Gnaeus Cornelius Merula =

Gnaeus Cornelius Merula was appointed legatus by the senate in 162—161 BC, to adjudge the disputes between the brothers Ptolemy Philometor and Physcon regarding the sovereignty of Cyprus. Merula accompanied Physcon to Crete and Asia Minor, and, after an ineffectual embassy to the elder brother at Alexandria, he induced the senate, on his return to Rome, to cancel the existing treaty with Philometor.
