= Aëtus son of Aëtus =

Aëtus son of Aëtus (in Greek Ἀετὸς τοῦ Ἀετοῦ, in ancient Egyptian (transliterated from demotic) Ꜣyꜣtws (sꜣ) Ꜣyꜣtws) was a priest in the Ptolemaic cult of Alexander the Great under the reign of Ptolemy V. According to the inscription on the Rosetta Stone Aëtus in 196 BC held the annual priesthood "of Alexander and the Saviour Gods and the Sibling Gods and the Beneficent Gods and the Sibling-loving Gods and the Father-loving God", that is, of Alexander the Great, Ptolemy I Soter and his wife Berenice I Soter, Ptolemy II and his wife and sister Arsinoe II, Ptolemy III Euergetes and his wife Berenice II Euergetis, Ptolemy IV Philadelphus and his wife and sister Arsinoe III Philadelphia, and finally of the young king Ptolemy V Philopator who was still on the throne. All these were worshipped as gods in Ptolemaic Egypt. Aëtus is thought to have been the grandson of Aëtus son of Apollonius, a native of Aspendus in Pamphylia, who became Strategos or military governor of Cilicia under the reign of Ptolemy II.

== Bibliography ==
- C. P. Jones, Christian Habicht, "A Hellenistic Inscription from Arsinoe in Cilicia" in Phoenix vol. 43 (1989)
- Joshua D. Sosin, "P.Duk.inv. 677: Aetos, from Arsinoite Strategos to Eponymous Priest" in Zeitschrift für Papyrologie und Epigraphik vol. 116 (1997) pp. 141–146 Text
