= Diipetes =

Meteorite fragments

Diipetes are objects, likely meteorite fragments, with coincidental human and animal forms, venerated in Ancient Greece as "thrown by the gods". See also Acheiropoetos (literally ‘not-made-by-hand’), an early Judeo-Christian tradition, and icon.

== Examples ==
- Diipetes Xoano of Athena

== Other uses ==
The Diipetes Journal is a quarterly journal in Greek published in Greece covering classical paganism and Hellenic polytheism since 1991.
