= Aristonicus (eunuch) =

2nd-century BC Ptolemaic official

Aristonicus (Latin; Greek Ἀριστόνικος Aristonikos) was a eunuch of Ptolemy V Epiphanes. He was brought up with the king from his early youth. Polybius speaks of him in terms of high praise, as a man of a generous and warlike disposition, and skilled in political transactions. In 185 BC, when the king had to fight against some discontented Egyptians, Aristonicus went to Greece and engaged a body of mercenaries there.
