= Anacleteria =

Greek feast

Anacleteria (from the Greek ἀνακλητήρια, ανα, and καλέω, "I call"), were feasts celebrated in Greek antiquity in honor of kings and princes. Anacleteria were celebrated when rulers took upon themselves the administration of their state, and made a solemn declaration thereof to the people.

The anacleteria of Ptolemy V Epiphanes was recorded in Polybius' Histories; Polybius writes that Ptolemy's courtier's "thought that the kingdom would gain a certain degree of firmness and a fresh impulse towards prosperity, if it were known that the king had assumed the independent direction of the government."
