= Ptolemaic cult of Alexander the Great =

Imperial cult in Hellenistic Egypt

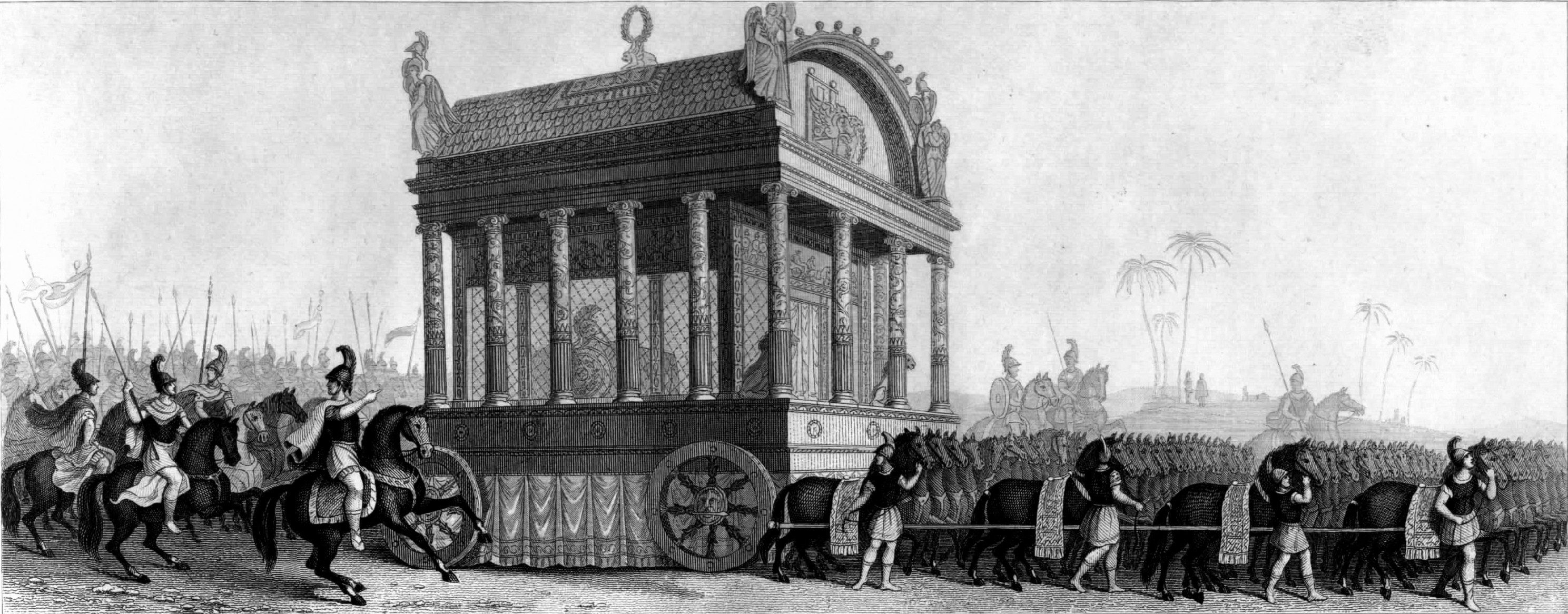
Mid-nineteenth century reconstruction of Alexander's catafalque based on the description by Diodorus.

The Ptolemaic cult of Alexander the Great was an imperial cult in ancient Egypt during the Hellenistic period (323–31 BC), promoted by the Ptolemaic dynasty. The core of the cult was the worship of the deified conqueror-king Alexander the Great, which eventually formed the basis for the ruler cult of the Ptolemies themselves. The head priest of the imperial cult was the chief priest in the Ptolemaic Kingdom.

== Background ==
Following the death of Alexander the Great in 323 BC, the Macedonian Empire fell apart in the Wars of the Diadochi (his generals, the Diadochi or "Successors"). One of them, Ptolemy, son of Lagos, secured rule of Egypt and made it the base for his own imperial ambitions. To legitimize his rule as Ptolemy I Soter (r. 323–282 BC), he relied, like the other Diadochi, not only on the right of conquest, but also on the supposed legitimate succession of Alexander. Not only did Ptolemy I portray himself as Alexander's closest friend in his historical work, but in 321 BC, he seized his body while Alexander's funeral procession was on its way to Macedon from Babylon, and brought it to the Egyptian capital at Memphis. This claim was particularly useful in Egypt, where Alexander had been greeted as liberator from the Achaemenid Empire (the so-called 27th and 31st dynasties) and had been enthroned as Pharaoh and son of the Egyptian deity Ammon-Ra, receiving divine honours. During his stay in Egypt, Alexander had also laid the foundations for the city of Alexandria, which became the main Greek colony and capital of the country.

In the newly-established Ptolemaic Kingdom, the Hellenic element (the Macedonians and the other Greeks from the Hellenic city-states), to which the Ptolemaic dynasty itself belonged, formed the ruling class which succeeded the native Egyptian Pharaohs. While sacred kingship had long been practised in ancient Egypt and other ancient Near Eastern civilizations, it was almost unheard-of in the Greek world. Driven by his unprecedented conquests, in the last year of his life Alexander had demanded even from his Greek subjects to be treated as a living God (apotheōsis). This was accepted only reluctantly, and often rejected outright, by the Greek cities, but Alexander's prolific founding of cities alone secured for him a divine status there, since Greek cities traditionally rendered their founder (Greek: κτίστης, romanized: ktistēs) divine honours. When Ptolemy took over Egypt, he incorporated the heritage of Alexander into his own propaganda to support the claims of his own dynasty. As part of this effort, Alexander was elevated from a simple patron god of Alexandria to the status of a state god for the Greek populations of the entire Ptolemaic empire, even beyond the confines of Egypt.

== Alexander as the chief god of the Ptolemies ==
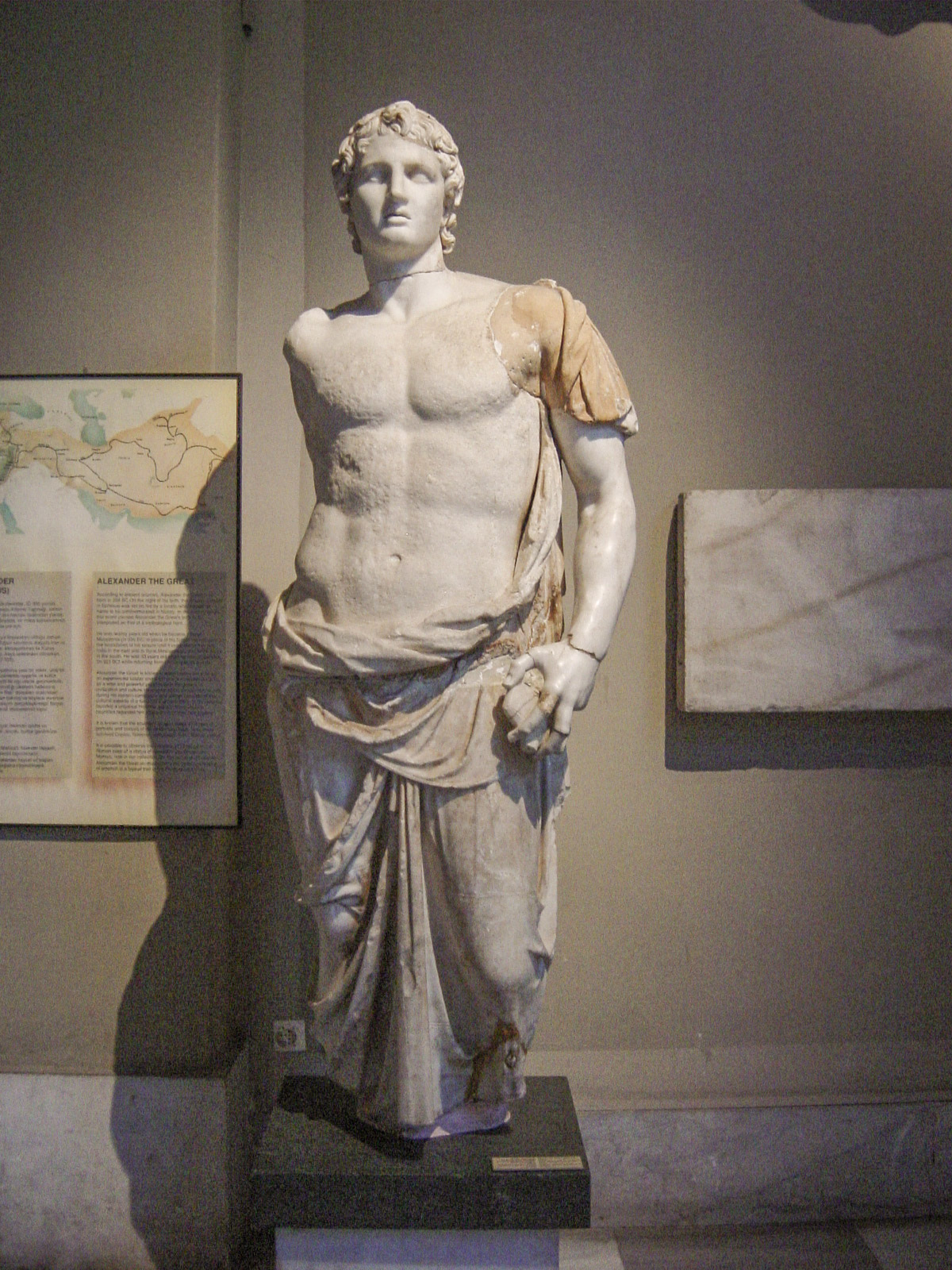
Alexander the Great, 3rd century BC statue in Istanbul Archaeological Museum, signed "Menas"

During the early Ptolemaic dynasty (c. 290 BC), Ptolemy I began the construction of the Tomb of Alexander the Great in Alexandria (the σῆμα, sēma), and appointed a priest (ἱερεύς, hiereus) to conduct religious rites there. This office quickly advanced to become the highest priesthood in the Ptolemaic Kingdom, its prominence underscored by its eponymous character, i.e., each regnal year was named after the incumbent priest, and documents, whether in Koine Greek or Demotic Egyptian, were dated after him. The first priest of Alexander was no less a figure than Ptolemy I's brother Menelaos. The tenure lasted one year, but under Ptolemy I, the priests apparently held the post for longer tenures, while under his successors, with few exceptions, the tenures were reduced to a single year.

Under Ptolemy II Philadelphus (r. 282–246 BC), Alexander's body was brought to the sēma, and, in contrast to the usual Greek custom of cremation, was entombed in a magnificent golden sarcophagus, which was eventually replaced by a transparent glass coffin to display his preserved body. Not only did the presence of Alexander's body in the Ptolemaic capital enhance the dynasty's prestige, but it also became one of the main attractions and pilgrimage sites in the ancient Mediterranean. Even Roman emperors made the journey to Alexandria to visit the great conqueror's tomb.

The Ptolemies assigned the deified Alexander a prominent place in the Greek pantheon, associating him with the Twelve Olympians like Zeus and Apollo. Accordingly, in documents Alexander was referred to simply by his name, as the epithet theos ("god") was regarded as superfluous.

== The Ptolemies as temple-sharing gods ==
While Ptolemy I Soter founded the imperial cult of Alexander, his son and successor Ptolemy II completed its connection to the ruler cult around the reigning dynasty itself. The cult of the Ptolemies began in 283/2 BC, when the deceased parents of Ptolemy II were deified as the "Saviour Gods" (θεοὶ σωτῆρες, theoi sōtēres). Statues of the deified couple were installed in the Temple of Alexander, and the priest of the Alexander cult took over the rites for the deified Ptolemies as well. With this gesture, the Ptolemies underlined the superior position of Alexander, and their own subordination to him as "temple-sharing gods" (σύνναοι θεοί, synnanoi theoi). Alexander remained the main recipient of rituals and sacrifices, with the Ptolemies only partaking in them.

The elevation of Alexander over the Ptolemies, and their connection to him, was further deepened through the expansion of the cult. Thus in 269 BC, the female priestly office of "basket bearer" (kanēphóros) for the "Sibling Goddess" (thea adelphos) Arsinoe II was established, followed in 211 BC by the "prize-bearer" priestess (athlophoros) in honour of the "Benefactor Goddess" (thea euergetis), Berenice II, and in 199 BC by a priestess for the "Father-Loving Goddess" (thea philopatōr), Arsinoe III. All these priesthoods were subordinate to the priest of Alexander.

Cleopatra III added three further female priesthoods for her own personal cult as "Benefactor and Mother-Loving Goddess" (thea euergetis philometōr): the "sacred foal" (hieros pōlos), the "crown bearer" (stephanēphoros), and the "light bearer" (phōsphoros).

The concept of "temple-sharing gods" was underlined under Ptolemy IV Philopator (r. 221–204 BC), who transported the remains of the Ptolemies and their consorts—unlike Alexander, they had been cremated and kept in urns—to the sēma.

== List of priests of Alexander ==
The most recent list is W. Clarysse - G. Van der Veken, The Eponymous Priests of Ptolemaic Egypt, Papyrologica Lugduono-batava 24 (1983).

=== Ptolemy I Soter (305–282 BC) ===
Priest		Tenure	Regnal year	References	Comments
006	Menelaos, son of Lagos	285/284 BC	39th	P. Hib. I 84a.	Brother of Ptolemy I 4th tenure
007	Menelaos, son of Lagos	284/283 BC	40th	P. Eleph. 2.	5th tenure
008	Eureas, son of Proitos	283/282 BC	41st	P. Eleph. 3.	Served for three tenures

=== Ptolemy II Philadelphos (285/282–246 BC) ===
Priest		Tenure	Regnal year	References	Comments
For the priests Nr. 9–16, from the 4th to the 11th regnal years of Ptolemy II Philadelphos, there exist two papyri with priest names, but which cannot be precisely dated.
?	Athenaios or Limnaios, son of Apollonios	?	?	P. Hib. I 97.	
?	Philiskos, son of Spoudaios	?	?	P. Hib. I 30.	
017	Leontiskos, son of Kallimedes	274/273 BC	12th	P. Cair. Zen. I 59001. P. Hib. I 110.	
018	Nearchos or Neomedes, son of Neokles or Philokles	273/272 BC	13th	P. Hib. I 110; II 199.	
019	Kallikrates, son of Boiskos	272/271 BC	14th	P. Hib. II 199. PP VI 14607.	From Samos. First priest of Alexander and the deified Ptolemies (Theoi Adelphoi).
020	Patroklos, son of Patron	271/270 BC	15th	P. Hib. II 199. PP VI 15063.	Senior Ptolemaic commander in the Chremonidean War.
21	Archagathos son of Agathokles	270/269 BC	16th	P. Sorb. 3 70	
23	Lykos son of Klesias	268/267	18th	P. Sorb. 3 71	
For the priests Nr. 21–25, from the 16th to the 20th regnal years of Ptolemy II, there are no extant records.
026	Timarchides, son of Asklepiodoros	265/264 BC	21st	P. Strasb. V 641.	
027	Pelops, son of Alexandros	264/263 BC	22nd	P. Hib. I 92. PP VI 14618.	From Macedon, father of Pelops
028	Kineas, son of Alketas	263/262 BC	23rd	P. Hib. I 88; II 209. PP VI 17215.	From Thessaly
029	Aristonikos, son of Perilaos	262/261 BC	24th	P. Hib. I 85 und 190. PP VI 14897.	
030	Ptolemy, son of Aratokles	261/260 BC	25th	P. Hib. I 143. P. Osl. II 16. PP III/IX 5236.	
031	Taurinos, son of Alexandros	260/259 BC	26th	BGU VI 1226.	From Macedon, brother of Pelops
032	Medeios, son of Lampon (or Laagon)	259/258 BC	27th	BGU VI 1227. P. Petrie III 56b.	
033	Antiphilos, son of Lykinos	258/257 BC	28th	BGU VI 1228. P. Hib. I 94.	
034	Antiochos, son of Kebbas	257/256 BC	29th	BGU VI 1229; X 1979, 1980. P. Cair. Zen. I 59133. P. Hib. I 95.	From Thessaly
035	?	256/255 BC	30th		
036	Glaukon, son of Eteokles	255/254 BC	31st	PP IX 5203. P. Cair. Zen. II 59173, 59182.	Brother of Chremonides from Athens
037	?	254/253 BC	32nd		
038	Aetos, son of Apollonios	253/252 BC	33rd	P. Cair. Zen. II 59248. PP IX 4988.	From Aspendos
039	Neoptolemos, son of Kraisis	252/251 BC	34th	P. Hib. I 98.	From Pisidia
040	Ptolemy, son of Andromachos	251/250 BC	35th	P. Cair. Zen. II 59289.	Possibly identical with Ptolemy Andromachou
041	Epainetos, son of Epainetos	250/249 BC	36th	P. Cornell 2.	
042	?	249/248 BC	37th	P. Cornell 2.	
043	Antiochos, son of Kratidas	248/247 BC	38th	PP III/IX 4999. P. Petrie III 54a.	
044	Tlepolemos, son of Artapates	247/246 BC	39th	P. Cair. Zen. III 59340.	From Xanthos

=== Ptolemy III Euergetes (246–222 BC) ===
Priest		Tenure	Regnal year	References	Comments
044	Tlepolemos, son of Artapates	246/246 BC	1st		
045	Tlepolemos, son of Artapates	246/245 BC	2nd	P. Petrie III 43. PSI IV 385.	2nd tenure
046	Archelaos, son of Damas	245/244 BC	3rd	BGU X 1981. P. Hib. I 145. PP III/IX 5040.	
047	Archelaos, son of Damas	244/243 BC	4th	BGU X 1981. P. Hib. I 145. PP III/IX 5040.	2nd tenure
048	Aristobulos, son of Diodotos	243/242 BC	5th	P. Hib. I 171. PSI IV 389.	
049	Tantalos, son of Kleonikos	242/241 BC	6th	P. Petrie II 44 = III 54b.	
050	Archibios, son of Pheidon	241/240 BC	7th	P. Hausw. 2; 8; 9.	
051	Onomastos, son of Pyrgon or Pyrrhon	240/239 BC	8th	P. Hib. I 89; II 261, 262.	
052	Apollonides, son of Moschion	239/238 BC	9th	OGIS I 56.	
053	Apollonides, son of Moschion	238/237 BC	10th	P. Petrie IV 1.	2nd tenure
054	Seleukos	237/236 BC	11th	P. Petrie III 58d.	
055	Eukles, son of Eubatas	236/235 BC	12th	BGU X 1982. P. Petrie IV 16.	
056	Sosibios, son of Dioskourides	235/234 BC	13th	P. Petrie III 55a; IV 22. PP VI 14631.	
057	Hellanikos, son of Hellanikos (or Euphragoras?)	234/233 BC	14th	P. Amsterdam inv. 250.	
058	?, son of Leon	233/232 BC	15th	P. dem. Cair. II 30604.	
059	Aristomachos, son of Timandros	232/231 BC	16th	P. Hamb. inv. 676.	
060	Menneas, son of Menoitios	231/230 BC	17th	P. dem. Berl. 3089.	
061	?	230/229 BC	18th		
062	Philon, son of Antipatros	229/228 BC	19th	P. dem. Cair. II 31208; 31210.	
063	Ikatidas, son of Ikatidas	228/227 BC	20th	SB V 7631.	
064	Galestes, son of Philistion	227/226 BC	21st	P. Petrie III 21a–b. SB III 6277; 6301. P. dem. Cair. 30624.	
065	Alexikrates, son of Theogenes	226/225 BC	22nd	P. Petrie I 19; III 19c.	
066	Ptolemy, son of Chrysermos	225/224 BC	23rd	PP III/IX 5238; VI 14624.	
067	Archeteas, son of Iasios	224/223 BC	24th	P. Hamb. inv. I 24.	
068	Dositheos, son of Drimylos	223/222 BC	25th	CPJud. I 127d–e. III Maccabees 1, 3.	Born a Jew
069	?	222 BC	26th		

=== Ptolemy IV Philopator (222–205 BC) ===
Priest		Tenure	Regnal year	References	Comments
069	Nikanor, son of Bakchios	222/221 BC	1st	BGU VI 1273; X 1983.	
070	Pytheas, son of Apollodoros	221/220 BC	2nd	P. Hausw. 16. SB X 10450; XII 10859.	
071	Demetrios, son of Apelles	220/219 BC	3rd	BGU X 1984.	
072	Demetrios, son of Apelles	219/218 BC	4th	SB XII 11061.	
073	Mnasiades, son of Polykrates	218/217 BC	5th	BGU VI 1274.	From Argos, father of Polykrates
074	Ptolemy, son of Aeropos	217/216 BC	6th	PP III/IX 5239; VI 15168 und 15237.	From Argos
075	Agathokles, son of Agathokles	216/215 BC	7th	BGU VI 1262; X 1958; 1986.	
076	Ptolemy, son of Ptolemy	215/214 BC	8th	BGU VI 1264; 1275; 1276; 1277; 1278; X 1943; 1959; 1969.	
077	Andronikos, son of Nikanor	214/213 BC	9th	BGU X 1944; 1945; 1960; XIV 2397.	
078	Pythangelos, son of Philokleitos	213/212 BC	10th	BGU X 1946; 1947. SB III 6289.	
079	Eteoneus (?, son of Eteoneus?)	212/211 BC	11th	BGU X 1963; 1965. SB III 6288.	
080	Eteoneus (?, son of Eteoneus?)	211/210 BC	12th	P. dem. Berl. 3075.	
081	Antiphilos, son of Agathanor	210/209 BC	13th	P. BM Andrews 18.	
082	Aiakides, son of Hieronymos	209/208 BC	14th	P. Hausw. 14.	
083	Demosthenes or Timosthenes, son of Kratinos	208/207 BC	15th	P. BM Andrews 28.	
084	?	207/206 BC	16th		
085	?	206/205 BC	17th		
086	Asklepiades, son of Asklepiades	205 BC	18th	P. KölnÄgypt. 7.	

=== Ptolemy V Epiphanes (205–180 BC) ===
Priest		Tenure	Regnal year	References	Comments
086	?	205/204 BC	1st		
087	Aristomenes, son of Menneas	204/203 BC	2nd	P. dem. Cair. 30660, 30700.	From Alyzeia
088	Satyros, son of Eumenes	203/202 BC	3rd	PP III/IX 5263.	
089	Adaios, son of Gorgias	202/201 BC	4th	P. Tebt. III 820.	
090	Pausanias, son of Demetrios	201/200 BC	5th	P. Tebt. III 1003.	
091	Andromachos, son of Lysimachos	200/199 BC	6th		
092	Twnn, son of Ptolemy	199/198 BC	7th	P. dem. Louvre 2435.	
093	Demetrios, son of Sitalkes	198/197 BC	8th	P. dem. Louvre 3266.	
094	Aetos, son of Aetos	197/196 BC	9th	Rosetta Stone = OGIS I 90.	
095	Zoilos, son of Andros	196/195 BC	10th	London, BM EA 10624, 10629.	
096	Ptolemy, son of Ptolemy	195/194 BC	11th	PP IX 5240a.	
097	?	194/193 BC	12th		
098	?, son of Eumelos	193/192 BC	13th	P. Tebt. III 816.	
099	Theon, son of Zenodotos	192/191 BC	14th	BGU XIV 2388.	
100	Antipatros, son of Dionysios	191/190 BC	15th	London, BM EA 10560.	
101	?	190/189 BC	16th		
102	?	189/188 BC	17th		
103	Charileos, son of Nymphion	188/187 BC	18th	P. Mich. inv. 928.	
104	Aristonikos, son of Aristonikos	187/186 BC	19th		From Alexandria
105	Timotheos, son of Timotheos	186/185 BC	20th	P. Mich. inv. 3156. P. BM. Reich 10226.	
106	Ptolemy, son of Ptolemy	185/184 BC	21st	PP III/IX 5241, VI 14946.	
107	Ptolemy, son of Ptolemy	184/183 BC	22nd	PP III/IX 5241, VI 14946.	2nd tenure
108	Ptolemy, son of Pyrrhides	183/182 BC	23rd	Stele 5576.	
109	Hegesistratos, son of Hegesistratos	182/181 BC	24th	P. BM Andrews 10.	
110	?, son of Zenodoros	181/180 BC	25th		

=== Ptolemy VI Philometor (180–170 BC) ===
Priest		Tenure	Regnal year	References	Comments
110	?	181/180 BC	1st		
111	Poseidonios, son of Poseidonios	180/179 BC	2nd	P. Amh. II 42.	
112	Philon, son of Kastor	179/178 BC	3rd	P. dem. Cair. 30783, 30968.	From Alexandria
113	?	178/177 BC	4th		
114	Ptolemy, son of Ptolemy	177/176 BC	5th	London, BM EA 10518.	
115	Ptolemy, son of Philokrates	176/175 BC	6th		
116	Philostratos, son of Asklepiodotos	175/174 BC	7th	P. Tebt. III 818, 979.	
117	Herakleodoros, son of Apollophanes	174/173 BC	8th	P. Amh. II 43.	
118	Apollodoros, son of Zenon	173/172 BC	9th	P. BM Siut 10594. P. Mich. inv. 190.	
119	Demetrios, son of Demokles	172/171 BC	10th	P. Tebt. III 819.	
120	Alexandros, son of Epikrates	171/170 BC	11th	London, BM EA 10675.	

=== Ptolemy VI Philometor / Ptolemy VIII Physcon / Cleopatra II (170–145 BC) ===
Priest		Tenure	Regnal year	References	Comments
121	Pyrrhos, son of Pyrrhos	170/169 BC	12th / 1st	London, BM EA 10513.	
122	?	169/168 BC	13th / 2nd		
123	?	168/167 BC	14th / 3rd		
124	?	167/166 BC	15th / 4th		
125	Melagkomas (son of Philodamos?)	166/165 BC	16th / 5th	PP III/IX 5194.	From Aetolia
126	Polykritos, son of Aristodemos	165/164 BC	17th / 6th		
127	Herakleides or Herakleitos, son of Philoxenos	164/163 BC	18th / 7th		
128	Isidotos, son of Theon or Thyion	163/162 BC	19th / 8th		
129	?	162/161 BC	20th / 9th		
130	?	161/160 BC	21st / 10th		
131	?	160/159 BC	22nd / 11th		
132	?	159/158 BC	23rd / 12th		
133	Ptolemy, son of Ptolemy	158/157 BC	24th / 13th	P. dem. Cair. 30606. London, BM EA 10561, 10618.	Eldest son of Ptolemy VI and Cleopatra II
134	?	157/156 BC	25th / 14th		
135	Kaphisodoros, son of Kaphisodoros	156/155 BC	26th / 15th	PP III/IX 5167.	
136	?	155/154 BC	27th / 16th		
137	?	154/153 BC	28th / 17th		
138	Demetrios, son of Stratonikos	153/152 BC	29th / 18th		
139	?	152/151 BC	30th / 19th		
140	?	151/150 BC	31st / 20th		
141	Epitychos or Epidikos	150/149 BC	32nd / 21st	London, BM EA 10620.	
142	?	149/148 BC	33rd / 22nd		
143	Kallikles, son of Diokrates or Theokrates	148/147 BC	34th / 23rd	P. dem. Cair. 31179.	
144	?, son of Zoilos	147/146 BC	35th / 24th	London, BM EA 10620(b).	
145	Tyiywns, son of Xanthippos	146/145 BC	36th / 25th	P. dem. Cair. 30605.	

=== Ptolemy VIII Euergetes II / Cleopatra II (145–141 BC) ===
Priest		Tenure	Regnal year	References	Comments
145	Tyiywns, son of Xanthippos	145 BC	25th	P. dem. Cair. 30605.	
146	?	145/144 BC	26th		
147	Ptolemy, son of Ptolemy	144/143 BC	27th	P. Köln VIII 350.	Second son of Ptolemy VI and Cleopatra II, who according to older research reigned briefly as Ptolemy VII in 145 BC.
148	?	143/142 BC	28th		
149	?	142/141 BC	29th		

=== Ptolemy VIII Euergetes II / Cleopatra II / Cleopatra III (141–116 BC) ===
Priest		Tenure	Regnal year	References	Comments
150	?	141/140 BC	30th		
151	(- -) son of Phaunikos	140/139 BC	31st	P. Freib. ined. 76 xv	
152	?	139/148 BC	32nd		
153	Dionysios, son of Demetrios	138/137 BC	33rd	P. dem. Cair. 30619.	
154	?	137/136 BC	34th		
155	Antipatros, son of Ammonios	136/135 BC	35th	P. Tebt. III 810.	
156	Ptolemy, son of Ptolemy	135/134 BC	36th	P. Tebt. III 810.	Son of Ptolemy VIII, probably Ptolemy Memphites or possibly Ptolemy IX
157	Ptolemy, son of Ptolemy and Cleopatra	134/13 BC	37th	P. Dem. Tebt. 5944	Son of Ptolemy VIII and Cleopatra III, probably Ptolemy IX or possibly Ptolemy X
For the priests Nr. 158–171, from the 38th to 50th regnal years of Ptolemy VIII Euergetes II, there are no extant records.
172	Apollonios, son of Eirenaios	120/119 BC	51st	London, BM EA 10398.	
173	Ptolemy, son of Kastor	119/118 BC	52nd	PP III/IX 5251. P. Hamb. inv. 12.	
174	?	118/117 BC	53rd		
175	?	117/116 BC	54th		

=== Cleopatra III / Ptolemy IX Soter II (116–107 BC) ===
Priest	Tenure	Regnal year	References	Comments
?	116 BC	1st		
Ptolemy IX Philometor Soter	116/115 BC	2nd	P. dem. Cair. 30602; 30603.	
Ptolemy IX Theos Philometor Soter	115/114 BC	3rd	P. Genf. I, 25. P. Strasb. 81, 83, 84.	
Ptolemy IX Theos Philometor Soter	114/113 BC	4th	P. Genf. II, 20. P. Strasb. 85. BGU 944.	
Ptolemy IX Theos Philometor Soter	113/112 BC	5th	P. Lond. III 1204.	
Artemidor, son of Sation; Ptolemy IX Theos Philometor Soter	112/111 BC	6th	P. Strasb. 86.	Artemidor occupied the office in the first months of the regnal year. Probably a supporter of Cleopatra III.
Ptolemy IX Theos Philometor Soter	111/110 BC	7th	?	
Ptolemy IX Theos Philometor Soter	110/109 BC	8th	BGU III 995.	
Ptolemy IX Theos Philometor Soter	109/108 BC	9th	P. Lond. III 881.	
Ptolemy IX Theos Philometor Soter	108/107 BC	10th	?	
Ptolemy IX Theos Philometor Soter	107 BC	11th	BGU III 996.	

=== Cleopatra III / Ptolemy X Alexander I (107–101/88 BC) ===
Priest	Tenure	Regnal year	References	Comments
Ptolemy X Theos Neos Alexandros	107/106 BC	11th / 8th	P. Bruxelles inv. E. 7155, 7156A.	
Ptolemy X Theos Neos Alexandros	106/105 BC	12th / 9th	P. Tebt. I 166.	
Cleopatra III Thea Euergetis Philometor	105/104 BC	13th / 10th	P. Köln II 81.	

== Union of the priesthood to the royal title ==
Ptolemy, son of Castor, is the last priest of Alexander known by name, before the position was merged into the royal office. Since the priesthood of Alexander is first attested in the royal titulature in the second year of the joint reign of Ptolemy IX and Cleopatra III (116/115 BC), it is unclear whether the merge of the offices took place in the last two years of Ptolemy VII's rule, or with the accession of his successors. It is possible that the merger was done at the initiative of Ptolemy IX, as part of an effort to emphasize his precedence over his co-ruling mother, Cleopatra III. As such, the office changed its role and character, from an eponymous priesthood to a propaganda tool: unlike the royal office, which was increasingly shared among siblings or other family members from the early 2nd century BC on, the priesthood of Alexander was indivisible. This must have appealed to Ptolemy IX, eager to set himself apart from his mother, who he hated and who had begun her own priestly cult around her own person.

This new role of the priesthood of Alexander can be traced in later reigns as well. In the first months of 112/111 BC, an ordinary citizen, Artemidorus, occupied the office. He was probably a partisan of Cleopatra III, who had succeeded to temporarily evict her son from Alexandria. As women could not occupy a supreme priesthood in the Greek world, she had to content herself with placing one of her supporters in the post, as a public sign of her new dominance. After Artemidorus, however, the name of Ptolemy IX was subsequently added in the papyrus, which means that he managed to return to Alexandria in the same year.

In 107 BC, Cleopatra III managed to expel Ptolemy IX for good from Alexandria, and raised her second son, Ptolemy X, to the throne as her co-ruler and priest of Alexander. As the inter-dynastic rivalry continued, however, in 105 BC she finally decided to assume the priesthood herself, to underline her precedence. Cleopatra probably intended this arrangement to be permanent, but her blatant violation of Greek norms in assuming the priesthood must have damaged her image among the Greeks. The last years of her reign were taken up with her persistent conflict with Ptolemy IX, until she died in 101 BC, probably following an assassination attempt by Ptolemy IX, whereupon Ptolemy X became sole ruler. The priestly and royal offices remained united under Ptolemy X and his successors, although the priestly title was rarely mentioned in the papyri, as the loss of its eponymous character rendered it irrelevant for dating purposes.

== Abbreviations ==
- BGU = Ägyptische Urkunden aus den Staatlichen Museen zu Berlin, Griechische Urkunden. (13 volumes published since 1895; New prints of Vols. I–IX, Milan 1972).
- CPJud = Victor A. Tcherikover, Alexander Fuks: Corpus Papyrorum Judaicarum. Vol. I, Cambridge (Massachusetts) 1957.
- London, BM EA = inventory numbers of papyri and inscriptions of the British Museum, London.
- OGIS = Wilhelm Dittenberger: Orientis Graeci inscriptiones selectae. Col. I, Leipzig 1903.
- P. Amh. = B. P. Grenfell, A. S. Hunt: The Amherst PapyrI 2 Vols. London 1900–1901.
- P. Amsterdam inv. = Papyrus inventory of the University of Amsterdam.
- P. BM Andrews = C. A. R. Andrews: Ptolemaic Legal Texts from the Theban Area. London 1990.
- P. dem. Berl. = Demotische Papyri aus den Staatlichen Museen zu Berlin., 3 Vols, Berlin 1978–1993.
- P. Bruxelles inv. = Papyrus inventory of the Royal Museums of Art and History, Brussels.
- P. Cair. Zen. = C. C. Edgar: Zenon Papyri Vols. I–V, Cairo 1925–1931.
- P. Cornell = W. L. Westermann, C. J. Kraemer Jr.: Greek Papyri in the Library of Cornell University. New York 1926.
- P. dem. Cair. = Wilhelm Spiegelberg: Die Demotischen Denkmäler. Col. I: Die demotischen Inschriften. Leipzig 1904; Vol. II: Die demotischen PapyrI Strasbourg 1908; Vol: III: Demotische Inschriften und Papyri Berlin 1932.
- P. Eleph. = Otto Rubensohn: Aegyptische Urkunden aus den königlichen Museen in Berlin. In: Griechische Urkunden. Extra issue: Elephantine Papyri Berlin 1907.
- P. Genf. I = J. Nicole: Les Papyrus de Genève. Vol. I, Geneva 1896–1906.
- P. Hamb. inv. = P. Meyer: Griechische Papyrusurkunden der Hamburger Staats- und Universitätsbibliothek. Leipzig/Berlin 1911–1924.
- P. Hib. I = Bernard P. Grenfell, Arthur S. Hunt: The Hibeh Papyri Part I, London 1906.
- P. Hib. II = E. G. Turner: The Hibeh Papyri Part II, London 1955.
- P. Hausw. = Wilhelm Spiegelberg, Josef Partsch: Die demotischen Hauswaldt Papyri: Verträge der ersten Hälfte der Ptolemäerzeit (Ptolemaios II.–IV.) aus Apollinopolos (Edfu). Leipzig 1913.
- P. KölnÄgypt. = D. Kurth, H.-J. Thissen und M. Weber (Hrsg.): Kölner ägyptische Papyri Opladen 1980.
- P. Köln II = B. Kramer und D. Hagedorn: Kölner Papyri Vol. 2, Opladen 1978.
- P. Köln VIII = M. Gronewald, K. Maresch und C. Römer: Kölner Papyri Vol. 8, Opladen 1997.
- P. Lond. III = F. G. Kenyon, H. I. Bell: Greek Papyri in the British Museum. Vol. III, London 1907.
- P. Mich. inv. = Papyrus inventory of the University of Michigan.
- P. Osl. = S. Eitrem, L. Amundsen: Papyri Osloenses. Vols. II–III, Oslo 1931–1936.
- P. Petrie = J. P. Mahaffy, J. G. Smyly: The Flinders Petrie Papyri Vols. I–III, Dublin, 1891–1905.
- P. BM. Reich = Nathaniel Reich J.: Papyri juristischen Inhalts in hieratischer und demotischer Schrift aus dem British Museum. Vienna 1914.
- P. BM Siut = Herbert Thompson: A Family Archive from Siut from Papyri in the British Museum. Oxford 1934.
- P. Strasb. = Papyrus grecs de la Bibliothèque Nationale et Universitaire de Strasbourg. Strasbourg 1912–1914.
- P. Tebt. I = B. P. Grenfell, A. S. Hunt, J. G. Smyly: The Tebtunis Papyri Vol. I, London 1902.
- P. Tebt. III = Bernard P. Grenfell, Arthur S. Hunt, J. Gilbart Smyly: The Tebtunis Papyri Vol. III, London 1933.
- PP VI = Willy Peremans, Edmond Van‘t Dack, Leon Mooren, W. Swinnen: Prosopographia Ptolemaica VI: La cour, les relations internationales et les possessions extérieures, la vie culturelle (Nos 14479-17250). In: Studia Hellenistica. Bd. 21, Louvain 1968.
- PP III/IX = Willy Clarysse: Prosopographia Ptolemaica IX: Addenda et Corrigenda au volume III In: Studia Hellensitica. Vol. 25, Louvain, 1981.
- PSI = Papyri Greci e LatinI Vols. I–XIV, Florence 1912–1957.
- SB = Hans A. Rupprecht, Joachim Hengstl: Sammelbuch griechischer Urkunden aus Ägypten. Vols. I–XXVI, 1903–2006.
- Stele 5576 = Urbain Bouriant: La Stèle 5576 du Musée de Boulaq et l’Inscription de Rosette. In: Recueil de travaux, Vol. 6, Paris 1885, pp. 1–20.

== See also ==
- Veneration of the dead

== Bibliography ==
- Walter Otto: priest und Tempel im hellenistischen Aegypten. Vol. I, Teubner, Leipzig 1905, OCLC 310121616.
- Lily Ross Taylor: The cult of Alexander in Alexandria. In: Classic Philology. Vol. 22, 1927, pp. 162–169.
- S. R. K. Glanville, T. C. Skeat: Eponymous Priesthoods of Alexandria from 211 B.C. In: The Journal of Egyptian Archaeology. Vol. 40, 1954, pp. 45–58.
- J. IJsewijn: De sacerdotibus sacerdotiisque Alexandri Magni et Lagidarum eponymis. Brussels 1961, OCLC 3747093.
- L. Koenen: Cleopatra III als priestin des Alexanderkultes (P. Colon. inv. nr. 5063). In: Zeitschrift für Papyrologie und Epigraphik. Vol. 5 (1970), pp. 61–84.
- W. Clarysse, G. van der Veken: The Eponymous Priests of Ptolemaic Egypt. Brill, Leiden 1983, ISBN 90-04-06879-1.
