= Hellenistic religion =

Late form of ancient Greek religion

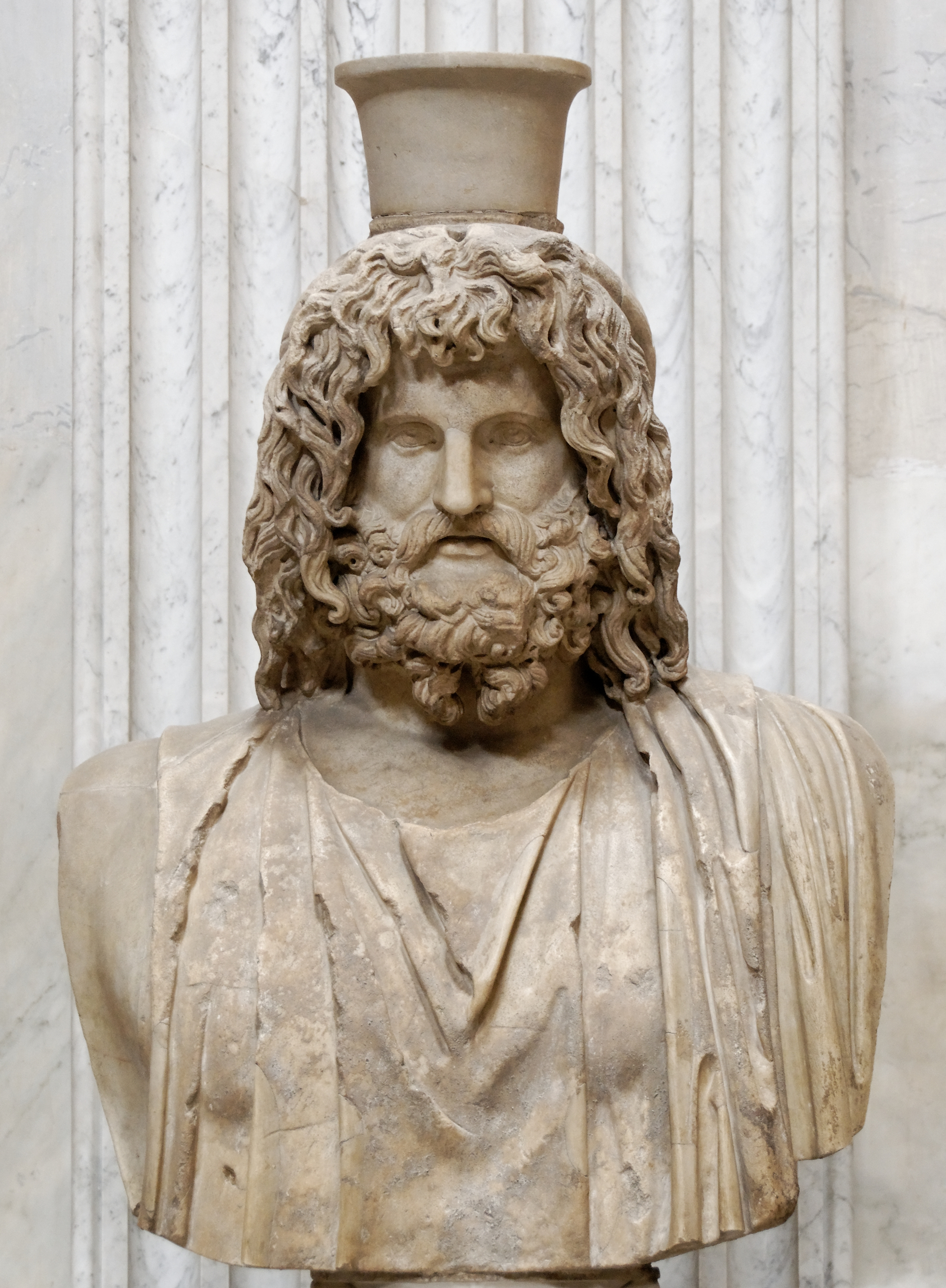
Serapis, a Greco-Egyptian god worshipped in Hellenistic Egypt

The concept of Hellenistic religion as the late form of Ancient Greek religion covers any of the various systems of beliefs and practices of the people who lived under the influence of ancient Greek culture during the Hellenistic period and the Roman Empire (c. 300 BCE to 300 CE). There was much continuity in Hellenistic religion: people continued to worship the Greek gods and to practice the same rites as in Classical Greece.

Change came from the addition of new religions from other countries, including the Egyptian deities Isis and Serapis, and the Syrian gods Atargatis and Hadad, which provided a new outlet for people seeking fulfillment in both the present life and the afterlife. The worship of deified Hellenistic rulers also became a feature of this period, most notably in Egypt, where the Ptolemies adapted earlier Egyptian practices and Greek hero-cults and established themselves as Pharaohs within the new syncretic Ptolemaic cult of Alexander III of Macedonia. Elsewhere, rulers might receive divine status without achieving the full status of a god and goddess.

Many people practiced magic, and this too represented a continuation from earlier times. Throughout the Hellenistic world, people would consult oracles, and use charms and figurines to deter misfortune or to cast spells. The complex system of Hellenistic astrology developed in this era, seeking to determine a person's character and future in the movements of the Sun, Moon, and planets. The systems of Hellenistic philosophy, such as Stoicism and Epicureanism, offered a secular alternative to traditional religion, even if their impact was largely limited to educated elites.

== Classical Greek religion ==
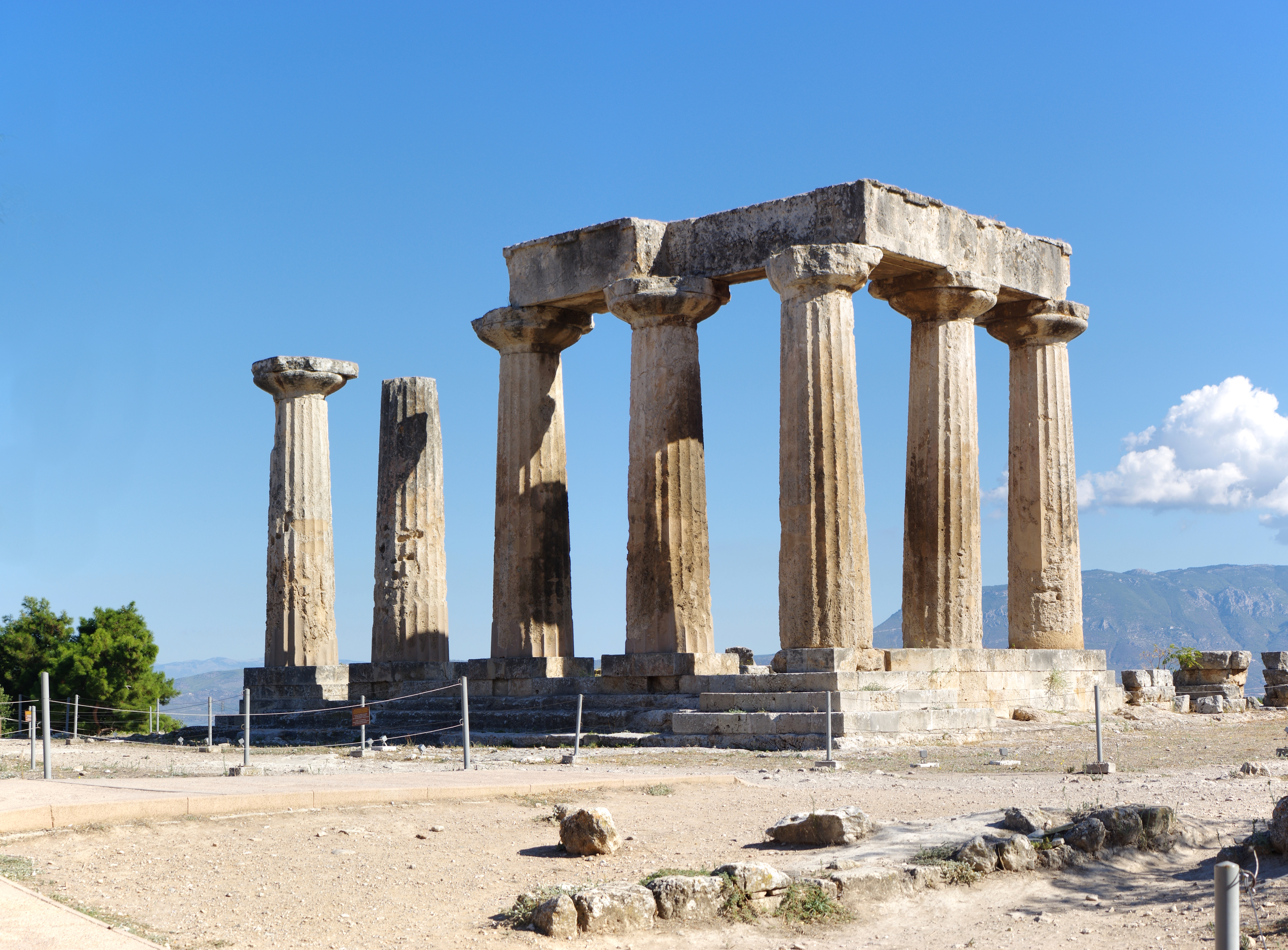
Remains of the Temple of Apollo at Corinth, south-central Greece.

Central to Greek religion in classical times were the twelve Olympian deities headed by Zeus. Each god was honored with stone temples and statues, and sanctuaries (sacred enclosures), which, although dedicated to a specific deity, often contained statues commemorating other gods. The city-states would conduct various festivals and rituals throughout the year, with particular emphasis directed towards the patron god of the city, such as Athena at Athens, or Apollo at Corinth.

The religious practice would also involve the worship of heroes, people who were regarded as semi-divine, such as Achilles, Heracles, and Perseus. Such heroes ranged from the mythical figures in the epics of Homer to historical people such as the founder of a city. At the local level, the landscape was filled with sacred spots and monuments; for example, many statues of Nymphs were found near and around springs, and the stylized figures of Hermes could often be found on street corners.

Magic was a central part of Greek religion and oracles would allow people to determine divine will in the rustle of leaves; the shape of flame and smoke on an altar; the flight of birds; the noises made by a spring; or in the entrails of an animal. Also long established were the Eleusinian Mysteries, associated with Demeter and Persephone. People were indoctrinated into mystery religions through initiation ceremonies, which were traditionally kept secret. These religions often had a goal of personal improvement, which would also extend to the afterlife.

In the aftermath of the conquests of Alexander the Great, Greek culture spread widely and came into much closer contact with the civilizations of the Near East and Egypt. The most significant changes to impact on Greek religion were the importation of foreign deities and the development of new philosophical systems. Older surveys of Hellenistic religion tended to depict the era as one of religious decline, discerning a rise in scepticism, agnosticism and atheism, as well as an increase in superstition, mysticism, and astrology.

There is, however, no reason to suppose that there was a decline in the traditional religion. There is plenty of documentary evidence that the Greeks continued to worship the same gods with the same sacrifices, dedications, and festivals as in the classical period. New religions did appear in this period, but not to the exclusion of the local deities, and only a minority of Greeks were attracted to them.

=== New religions of the period ===
The Egyptian religion which follows Isis was the most famous of the new religions. The religion was brought to Greece by Egyptian priests, initially for the small Egyptian communities in the port cities of the Greek world. Although the Egyptian religion found only a small audience among the Greeks themselves, her popularity spread under the Roman Empire, and Diodorus Siculus wrote that the religion was known throughout almost the whole inhabited world.

Almost as famous was the cult of Serapis, an Egyptian deity despite the Greek name, which was created in Egypt under the Ptolemaic dynasty. Serapis was patronized by the Greeks who had settled in Egypt. This religion involved initiation rites like the Eleusinian Mysteries. Strabo wrote of the Serapeion at Canopus near Alexandria as being patronized by the most reputable men.

The religion of Atargatis (related to the Babylonian and Assyrian Inanna and Phoenician Baalat Gebal), a fertility and sea goddess from Syria, was also popular. By the 3rd century BCE her worship had spread from Syria to Egypt and Greece, and eventually reached Italy and the west. The religion following Cybele (or the Great Mother) came from Phrygia to Greece and then to Egypt and Italy, where in 204 BCE the Roman Senate permitted her worship. She was a healing and protecting goddess, and a guardian of fertility and wild nature.

Another mystery religion was focused around Dionysus. Although rare in mainland Greece, it was common on the islands and in Anatolia. The members were known as Bacchants, and the rites had an orgiastic character. Linked to this was the last of the Greco-Roman Gods and Goddesses, Antinous, who was syncretized with Osiris, Dionysus, and other deities.

These newly introduced religions and gods only had a limited impact within Greece itself; the main exception was at Delos, which was a major port and trading center. The island was sacred as the birthplace of Apollo and Artemis, and by the 2nd century BCE was also home to the native Greek religions that follow Zeus, Athena, Dionysus, Hermes, Pan, and Asclepius. But there were also cult centers for the Egyptian Sarapis and Isis, and of the Syrian Atargatis and Hadad. By the 1st century BCE, there were additional religions that followed Baal and Astarte, a Jewish Synagogue and Romans who followed the original Roman religions of gods like Apollo and Neptune.

=== Ruler cults ===
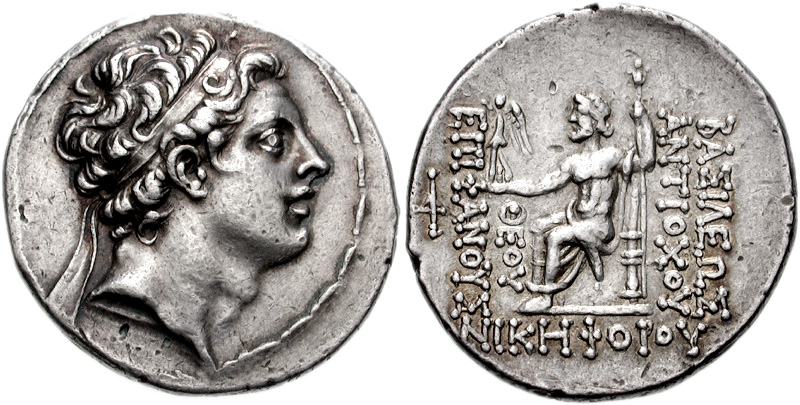
Tetradrachm depicting Antiochus IV Epiphanes; the Greek inscription reads as ΒΑΣΙΛΕΩΣ / ΑΝΤΙΟΧΟΥ / ΘΕΟΥ / ΕΠΙΦΑΝΟΥΣ / ΝΙΚΗΦΟΡΟΥ ("Of king Antiochus, image of God, bearer of victory")

Another innovation in the Hellenistic period was the institution of cults dedicated to the rulers of the Hellenistic kingdoms. The first of these was established under Alexander the Great, whose conquests of the Achaemenid Empire, power, and status had elevated him to a degree that required special recognition. His successors continued his worship to the point where in Egypt under Ptolemy I Soter, we find Alexander being honored as a god. Ptolemy's son Ptolemy II Philadelphus proclaimed his father a god, and made himself a living god.

By doing so, the Ptolemies were adapting earlier Egyptian ideas in Pharaonic worship. Elsewhere, practice varied; a ruler might receive divine status without the full status of a god, as occurred in Athens in 307 BCE, when Antigonus I Monophthalmus and Demetrius I Poliorcetes were honored as saviors (soteres) for liberating the city, and, as a result, an altar was erected; an annual festival was founded; and an office of the "Priest of the Saviours" was introduced. Temples dedicated to rulers were rare, but their statues were often erected in other temples, and the kings would be worshiped as "temple-sharing gods."

=== Astrology and magic ===
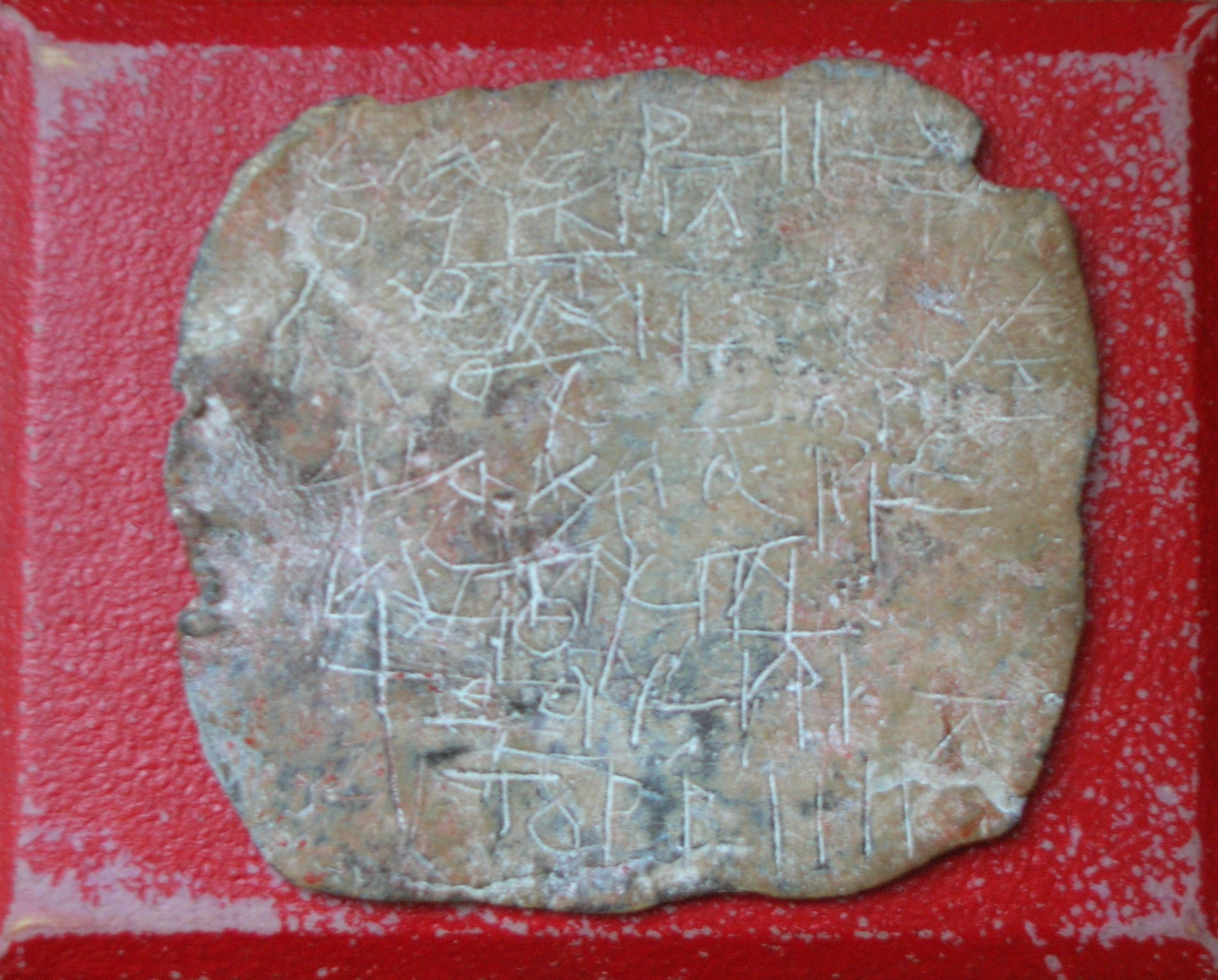
A Hellenistic curse tablet discovered in Eyguières, southern France.

There is ample evidence for the use of superstition and magic in this period. Oracular shrines and sanctuaries were still popular. There is also much evidence for the use of charms and curses. Symbols would be placed on the doors of houses to bring good luck or deter misfortune for the occupants within.

Charms, often cut in precious or semi-precious stone, had protective power. Figurines, manufactured from bronze, lead, or terracotta, were pierced with pins or nails, and used to cast spells. Curse tablets made from marble or metal (especially lead) were used for curses.

Astrology — the belief that stars and planets influence a person's future — arose in Babylonia, where it was originally only applied to the king or nation. The Greeks, in the Hellenistic era, elaborated it into the fantastically complex system of Hellenistic astrology familiar to later times. Interest in astrology grew rapidly from the 1st century BCE onwards.

=== Hellenistic philosophy ===
An alternative to traditional religion was offered by Hellenistic philosophy. One of these philosophies was Stoicism, which taught that life should be lived according to the rational order which the Stoics believed governed the universe; human beings had to accept their fate as according to divine will, and virtuous acts should be performed for their own intrinsic value. Another philosophy was Epicureanism, which taught that the universe was subject to the random movements of atoms, and life should be lived to achieve psychological contentment and the absence of pain. Other philosophies included Pyrrhonism which taught how to attain inner peace via suspension of judgment; Cynicism (philosophy), which expressed contempt for convention and material possessions; the Platonists who followed the teachings of Plato, and the Peripatetics who followed Aristotle. All of these philosophies, to a greater or lesser extent, sought to accommodate traditional Greek religion, but the philosophers, and those who studied under them, remained a small select group, limited largely to the educated elite.

== Hellenistic Judaism ==
Hellenistic Judaism was a form of Judaism in the ancient world that combined Jewish religious tradition with elements of Greek culture. Until the Fall of the Western Roman Empire and the Byzantine, Sassanid and Arab conquests of the Eastern and Western Mediterranean Basin, the main centers of Hellenistic Judaism were Alexandria (Egypt) and Antioch (Turkey), the two main Greek urban settlements of the Middle East and North Africa area, both founded at the end of the 4th century BCE in the conquests of Alexander the Great. Hellenistic Judaism also existed in Jerusalem during the Second Temple Period, where there was conflict between Hellenizers and traditionalists (sometimes called Judaizers).

The major literary product of the contact of Second Temple Judaism and Ancient Greek religion is the Septuagint translation of the Hebrew Bible from Biblical Hebrew and Biblical Aramaic to Koine Greek, specifically, Jewish Koine Greek. Mentionable are also the philosophic and ethical treatises of Philo and the historiographical works of the other Hellenistic Jewish authors.

The decline of Hellenistic Judaism started in the 2nd century CE, and its causes are still not fully understood. It may be that it was eventually marginalized by, partially absorbed into or became progressively the Koine Greek speaking core of Early Christianity centered on Antioch and its traditions, such as the Melkite Greek Catholic Church, and the Greek Orthodox Patriarchate of Antioch.

== See also ==
- Christianity and paganism
- Gnosticism
- Greco-Buddhism
- Greco-Roman mysteries
- Hellenism
- Hermeticism
- Humanism
- Interpretatio graeca
- Magic in the Greco-Roman world
- Neoplatonism
- Religion in ancient Rome
