= List of Ptolemaic governors of Cyprus =

The Ptolemaic governors of Cyprus ruled the island on behalf of the Ptolemaic Kingdom, from the abolition of the traditional kingdoms on the island in 312 BC until the conquest of the island by the ancient Romans.

== First period (312–306 BC) ==
The governors in this period are referred to as strategos (general) in literary sources, but as basileus (king) on their coinage.

Name	Dates	King
Nicocreon of Salamis	312–310 BC	Ptolemy I Soter
Menelaus, son of Lagus	310–306 BC	Ptolemy I Soter

Ptolemy lost Cyprus to Demetrius Poliorcetes after the Battle of Salamis in 306 BC.

== Second period (287–217 BC) ==
Cyprus was regained by Ptolemy after the death of Demetrius Poliorcetes in 287, but there is no certain evidence for a governor of Cyprus for the rest of his reign, or during the reigns of his successors, Ptolemy II Philadelphus (283–246 BC) and Ptolemy III Euergetes (246–222 BC). The office may not have existed.

== Third period (217–58 BC) ==
During this period, the governors of Cyprus bore the title of strategos kai archiereus (general and high priest). After 142 BC, they also bore the title of nauarchos (admiral). Governors usually held the rank of syngenes (royal kinsman) in the aulic titulature. The order and dates are according to Roger Bagnall.

Name	Dates	King
Pelops, son of Pelops	217–203 BC	Ptolemy IV Philopator
Polycrates of Argos	203–197 BC	Ptolemy V Epiphanes
Ptolemy, son of Agesarchos	197–180 BC	Ptolemy V Epiphanes
Ptolemy Macron	180–168 BC	Ptolemy VI Philometor and Ptolemy VIII Euergetes
Unknown	168–164 BC	Ptolemy VI Philometor and Ptolemy VIII Euergetes
Archias	163–158 BC	Ptolemy VI Philometor
Xenophon?	158–152 BC	Ptolemy VI Philometor
Andromachus?	152–145 BC	Ptolemy VI Philometor
Seleucus, son of Bithys	144 BC – c. 130 BC	Ptolemy VIII Euergetes
Crocus	c. 130 BC – 124 BC	Ptolemy VIII Euergetes
Theodorus, son of Seleucus	123–118 BC	Ptolemy VIII Euergetes
Helenus of Cyrene (1st time)	118–117 BC	Ptolemy VIII Euergetes
Ptolemy IX Soter	117–116 BC	Ptolemy VIII Euergetes
Ptolemy X Alexander	116–114 BC	Ptolemy IX Soter
Helenus of Cyrene (2nd time)	114–106 BC	Ptolemy IX Soter
King Ptolemy IX Soter (direct rule)	105–88 BC	himself
Potamon (deputy governor)	105–88 BC	Ptolemy IX Soter
Chaereas?	88–80 BC	Ptolemy IX Soter
King Ptolemy of Cyprus (direct rule)	80–53 BC	himself

== Fourth period (40s–30 BC) ==
Name	Dates	Overlord
Serapion	ca. 43–41 BC	Mark Antony and Cleopatra VII
Diogenes, son of Noumenios	40 BC	Mark Antony and Cleopatra VII
Demetrius?	39 BC	Mark Antony and Cleopatra VII

== See also ==
- Hellenistic Cyprus

== Bibliography ==
- Bagnall, Roger (1976). The Administration of the Ptolemaic Possessions Outside Egypt.
