= Ptolemaic navy =

Navy of Ptolemaic Egypt

- Active: 305–30 BC
- Country: Ptolemaic Kingdom
- Branch: Navy
- Size: est: 900–1,000 ships distributed into 4 fleets Alexandrian Fleet; Aegean Fleet; Nile River Fleet; Red Sea Fleet
- Engagements: Battle of Salamis (306 BC); Battle of Ephesus (258 BC); Battle of Cos (261/255 BC); Battle of Andros (246 BC); Battle of Actium (31 BC)

The Ptolemaic navy was the naval force of the Ptolemaic Kingdom and later empire from 305 to 30 BC. It was founded by King Ptolemy I. Its main naval bases were at Alexandria, Egypt and Nea Paphos in Cyprus. It operated in the East Mediterranean, in the Aegean Sea, the Levantine Sea, but also on the river Nile and in the Red Sea towards the Indian Ocean.

== History ==
There were a number of maritime powers competing across the Eastern Mediterranean during this period, and the major naval powers in the Aegean after the death of Alexander the Great were the Athenian navy and the navy of the Macedonian Empire. When the Athenians learned of Alexander's death, Athens was at the forefront of the rebellion from Macedonian hegemony, which developed into the Lamian War. Athens mobilized 170 ships to Macedon's 240, and that eventually the Macedonian navy 'destroyed' the Athenian fleet in a series of battles in 322 BC. After this the Athenian navy ceased to be an important independent naval force in the Aegean again. The period after the death of Alexander in 320 BC various successors to Alexander were competing with each other for naval supremacy to have an effective naval force in the Aegean and Eastern Mediterranean.

The early Ptolemies focused of developing naval instead of striving to develop a land empire in Greece or Asia. Ptolemy I initially competed against other Diadochoi for naval supremacy in the Eastern Mediterranean Sea, before experiencing a crushing defeat at the hands of Demetrius I at the Battle of Salamis in 306 BC. From 295 to 260 BC, the Ptolemaic navy seems to have been a dominant maritime force in the Aegean and Eastern Mediterranean. Ptolemy II, succeeding his father, maintained the policy ensuring the navy was dominant naval force in the Eastern Mediterranean. He expand the Ptolemaic navy into the Hellenistic world's largest navy, in addition to commissioning some of the largest warships ever built in the ancient world.

Ptolemy I's major maritime rival in the Aegean and Eastern Mediterranean was therefore Antigonus I (assisted by his son, Demetrius I of Macedon). The Macedonian king Perdiccas briefly threatened Ptolemy in 321 BC when he sent an army and naval force to invade Egypt, when this operation failed he was assassinated by his officers that fleet was eventually acquired by Antigonus. Antigonus chose not to focus on maritime affairs until 315 BC, after he first campaigned into the former Achaemenid Empire to defeat Eumenes. After this, he returned to the Mediterranean, where a coalition of Ptolemy, Cassander and Lysimachus was preparing to face him.

Antigonus started a gigantic ship-building program, building five dockyards stating he would soon have a navy of 500 ships, but only 250 of these were actually constructed. However, Ptolemy I had the ascendancy during this period, since Antigonus' demoralized troops complained that Ptolemy was "dominating the sea". During this period, when Antigonus focused his attention to the Aegean Sea, that was when Ptolemy I also became personally active in the Aegean. In 314 BC, Antigonus made his declaration of 'freedom for the Greeks', intending to scupper the political influence of the other Alexandrian successors in the Aegean. Feeling that his own political interests were being threatened by Antigonus he also issued a similar declaration, and order a naval force of 50 ships be sent to the Peloponnese, under the command of admiral Polycleitus.

In 313 BC, Seleucus (who was serving as Ptolemy's admiral) led a Ptolemaic fleet around Phoenicia and into the Aegean. This force assisted Cassander's navy in attacking Lemnos, before retiring to the island of Cos. Ptolemy I attentions then were diverted elsewhere, in dealing with a revolt in Cyrene and Demetrius' presence in Syria, as well as spending time organizing Cyprus. Antigonus’ war fleet was active around the Aegean in between 313 and 312 BC, and attacked Miletus. After the peace agreement brokered in 311 BC, Ptolemy I took personal command a Ptolemaic fleet sent on an expedition into the Aegean, the intention may have been to capture the Macedonian throne from Cassander. Ptolemy I succeeded in capturing Andros and Megara, and managed to military garrison both Sicyon and Corinth, after a diplomatic negotiations with Polyperchon. It was during this naval expedition that the future Ptolemy II was born on Cos during this naval expedition, which may have in influenced his own future interest in the maritime affairs.

In 306 BC, Antigonus ordered his fleet under his son Demetrius to head to Cyprus for what was to be the decisive naval conflict with Ptolemy, this naval engagement was known as the Battle of Salamis of 306 BC, that resulted in victory for Antigonid forces. Following the defeat of Ptolemaic navy at Salamis the Ptolemaic Kingdom ceased to be the dominant naval force in the Eastern Mediterranean. In 305 BC, the Antigonid navy sent a large fleet of 200 warships and 170 transports on an expedition to capture Rhodes one of Ptolemy’s major allies. Almost ten years following the navy's loss at Salamis, the navy was rebuilt and was once again projecting its naval power into the Aegean and Eastern Mediterranean, taking full control of Cyprus for good.

In 294 BC, as recorded by Plutarch, Demetrius began construction of a huge shipbuilding program that was to consist of 500 ships built at dockyards in Corinth, Chalcis, Pella, and Piraeus. This program was halted when following his seven year reign he lost his throne in 288 BC, at which point Ptolemy I took this chance to return to the matters of Greek affairs by personally commanding an expedition of his Aegean Fleet sent into the Aegean Sea. The expedition succeeded, he gained possession of Cyprus and strategic bases in the Aegean like Andros, the Ptolemaic navy once again became the strongest navy in the Eastern Mediterranean area.

After this, the Ptolemaic navy remained unchallenged for almost 30 years when there followed a number of decisive naval battles in the Aegean during the reign of Ptolemy II. The first was at the Battle of Ephesus involving the Ptolemaic Kingdom and its former ally Rhodes it took place of the coast of Anatolia at Ephesus. The Rhodian fleet was under the command of Agathostratus, whilst the Ptolemaic fleet was commanded by an Athenian admiral called Chremonides resulted in a major defeat for Ptolemaic navy. The outcome of which was the success breaking Ptolemaic dominance in the Aegean Sea.

To ensure the Ptolemaic navy never gained resurgence in the Aegean region, a further engagement, the Battle of Cos, said to have taken place either in 261 BC or 255 BC. This proved to be the decisive battle of the Second Syrian War. The battle was fought by the fleets of Ptolemy II and his admiral Patroclus against Antigonus II Gonatas of Macedonia, resulting in another defeat for the Ptolemaic navy, which also led to resurgence of Macedonian naval power in the region.

It was during the Chremonidean War that the Ptolemaic navy was able to effectively blockade Macedonia, and restricted Antigonus II to the mainland Greece. Nine years later in 246 BC the Ptolemaic Kingdom sent another fleet back to the Aegean during the Third Syrian War to confront the forces of Macedonia once again it was defeated and withdrew to Egypt.

For almost the next two hundred years the navy was not involved in any further major conflicts until the Final War of the Roman Republic, during which the Roman Senate declared war on the Ptolemaic Egyptian queen Cleopatra VII, Mark Antony, her lover and ally, betrayed the Roman government and joined the war on Cleopatra's side. After the decisive victory for Octavian at the naval engagement at Battle of Actium in 31 BC, Cleopatra and Antony withdrew to Alexandria, where Octavian besieged the city until both Antony and Cleopatra committed suicide in 30 BC. Ptolemaic Egypt was annexed as a Roman province, leaving the Roman navy as only force in the entire Mediterranean.

== Supreme commander ==
Callicrates held the title of nauarchos (admiral) and was appointed supreme commander of the Ptolemaic navy, in effect a Commander-in-Chief. The title was not conferred on a regular basis. In 142 BC, the 'nauarchia' was added to the functions of the governor-generals of Cyprus to denote supreme commander of the Ptolemaic Navy for the Mediterranean if not for the entire Ptolemaic Empire. This title and its responsibility was inscribed on the base of a statue of Seleucus, Governor of Cyprus (142–131 BC) erected by the city of Kourion. Governors of Cyprus from 142 BC down through to the reign of Ptolemy IX Soter II, co held two military titles that of Strategoi and Nauarch of the Ptolemaic Fleet.

Name	Dates	Appointer
Callicrates	270–250 BC	Ptolemy II
Seleucus, son of Bithys	144–ca. 130 BC	Ptolemy VIII Euergetes
Crocus	ca. 130–124 BC	Ptolemy VIII Euergetes
Theodorus, son of Seleucus	123–118 BC	Ptolemy VIII Euergetes
Helenus of Cyrene (1st time)	118–117 BC	Ptolemy VIII Euergetes
Ptolemy IX Soter II	117–116 BC<	Ptolemy VIII Euergetes
Ptolemy X Alexander	116–114 BC	Ptolemy IX Soter II
Helenus of Cyrene (2nd time)	114 BC–106 BC	Ptolemy IX Soter II
King Ptolemy IX Soter II	105–88 BC	himself
Potamon	105–88 BC	Ptolemy IX Soter II
Chaereas?	88–80 BC	Ptolemy IX Soter II
King Ptolemy of Cyprus	80–53 BC	himself

== Fleet commanders ==
Below is a list of post holders holding the title of nauarchos, some of whom were fleet commanders, commanding individual fleets, whilst others were supreme commanders of the navy such as Callicrates.

Name	Dates	Appointed by	Notes/Ref
Polycleitus	313 BC	Ptolemy I Soter	
Menelaus	322–254 BC	Ptolemy I Soter and Ptolemy II	
Zenon	286 BC	Ptolemy I Soter	
Timosthenes	280s–270s BC	Ptolemy II	
Philocles, King of Sidon	260–253 BC	Ptolemy II	
Perigenes	218 BC	Ptolemy IV Philopator	

== Fleets ==
=== Alexandrian fleet ===
The Ptolemaic Kingdom constructed a huge navy following the victory of Ptolemy II during the First Syrian War (274–271 BC), as a result the Ptolemaic navy was successful in repulsing both the Seleucid Empire and the Kingdom of Macedonia for control of the Eastern Mediterranean and the Aegean. Ancient Greek records seem to confirm that Ptolemy II possessed a fleet of 336 warships, that were rated according to the number of banks of oars they possessed. Athenaeus records that Ptolemy II had at his disposal more than 4,000 ships that consisted of individual war fleets in addition to transports and ships from allies. The Alexandrian fleet was said to number about 336 warships, not including those ships stationed elsewhere. The cost of maintaining this fleet would have been enormous.

=== Aegean fleet ===
The Aegean fleet was established and headquartered at Thera from the 3rd century BC. This was the main wartime fleet for the entire Aegean Sea and was stationed in the city's harbor. It was disbanded in 145 BC.

=== Nile River fleet ===
The Nile Fleet or Royal River fleet was a naval force garrisoned at Alexandria from at least the 3rd century BC. Part of this fleet included a river guard force or police patrol to ensure the free movement of commerce up and down the Nile, which in these times could be dangerous. The Nile fleet was operating until at least 94 BC.

=== Red Sea fleet ===
The Red Sea Fleet, was based at Berenice Troglodytica seaport of Egypt on the west coast of the Red Sea. The fleet's primary role was to protect trade convoys or shipping on the main trade route between South Arabia, India, Sri Lanka, and Upper Egypt.

== Bases and ports ==
Cyprus was the main base of the Ptolemaic navy outside of Alexandria for almost 200 years, it was where the Ptolemies sourced their timber to build their warships. Nea Paphos in southwest Cyprus was a centre of Ptolemaic administration, possessed a major harbor, and the city and the surrounding region. Its importance as a major shipbuilding location in Ptolemaic times when Ptolemy II Philadelphos had two very large ships built there by the naval architect Pyrgoteles son of Zoes. Nea Paphos became the Ptolemaic capital of Cyprus around 200 BC, and the headquarters of the Ptolemaic strategos. Ephesus was established as a naval base in 262 BC. After the Ptolemaic navy was defeated at the Battle of Ephesus (ca. 258 BC), the base was retaken by the Seleucid Empire. In 246 BC, Seleucid forces abandoned the base leaving the Ptolemies to move in again. Ephesos remained as a military base until 197 BC when Antiochus III seized the city. Samos was first established as a naval base between 280 and 270 BC. It remained an important naval base for the Ptolemies until 201 BCE when Philip V of Macedon conquered the island. In 197 BC, the base was recaptured by, shortly after that, the island regained its freedom. As with Itanos, Patroclus had built a military facility on the island of Thera in 267/6 BC whilst on his way to Attica leading Ptolemaic forces during the Chremonidean War. Patroclus then appointed Apollodotos as the base commander. After Ptolemy VIII ascended to the throne in 145 BC, he withdrew all Ptolemaic forces from Thera.

#	Base/Port	Area
1.	Alexandria	Mediterranean Sea
2.	Berenice Troglodytica	Red Sea
3.	Ephesus	Aegean Sea
4.	Itanos, Crete	Aegean Sea
5.	Kom Ombo	Upper Nile
6.	Nea Paphos, Cyprus	Levantine Sea
7.	Ptolemais, Phoenicia	Levantine Sea
8.	Salamis, Cyprus	Levantine Sea
9.	Samos	Aegean Sea
10.	Thera	Aegean Sea

== Naval engagements ==
#	battle	against	date/s	part of	result
1.	Naval expedition against Greece	Corinth, Megara & Sikyon	308 BC	Fourth War of the Diadochi	Won.
2.	Battle of Salamis	Macedonian navy & Athenian navy	306 BC	Fourth War of the Diadochi	Loss.
3.	Battle of Cos	Macedonian navy	261/255 BC	Second Syrian War	Loss.
4.	Battle of Ephesus	Rhodian navy	258 BC	Second or Third Syrian Wars	Loss.
5.	Battle of Andros	Macedonian navy	246 BC	Third Syrian War	Loss.
6.	Battle of the Plane Tree Pass	Seleucid navy	218 BC	Fourth Syrian War	Undecided
7.	Battle of Actium	Roman navy	31 BC	Final War of the Roman Republic	Loss.

== See also ==
- Ancient Egyptian navy
- Egyptian Fatimid navy
- Egyptian Tulunid navy
- Egyptian Navy
- Phylakitai, police of Ptolemaic Egypt
- Ptolemaic army

== Bibliography ==
- Bagnall, Roger S. (1976). The Administration of the Ptolemaic Possessions Outside Egypt. Leiden: E. J. Brill. ISBN 9789004044906.
- Bagnall, Roger S. (2004). Egypt from Alexander to the Early Christians: An Archaeological and Historical Guide. Los Angeles, California, United States: Getty Publications. ISBN 9780892367962.
- Buraselis, Kostas (2013). "Ptolemaic grain, seaways and power". In Buraselis, Kostas; Stefanou, Mary; Thompson, Dorothy J. (eds.). The Ptolemies, the Sea and the Nile: Studies in Waterborne Power. Cambridge University Press. pp. 97–107. ISBN 9781107033351.
- Fischer-Bovet, Christelle (2014). Army and Society in Ptolemaic Egypt. Cambridge, England: Cambridge University Press. ISBN 9781107007758.
- Hauben, Hans (2013). "Callicrates of Samos and Patroclus of Macedon, champions of Ptolemaic thalassocracy". In Buraselis, Kostas; Stefanou, Mary; Thompson, Dorothy J. (eds.). The Ptolemies, the Sea and the Nile: Studies in Waterborne Power. Cambridge University Press. pp. 39–65. ISBN 9781107033351.
- Kruse, Thomas (2013). "The Nile police in the Ptolemaic period". In Buraselis, Kostas; Stefanou, Mary; Thompson, Dorothy J. (eds.). The Ptolemies, the Sea and the Nile: Studies in Waterborne Power. Cambridge University Press. pp. 172–184. ISBN 9781107033351.
- Muhs, Brian (2 August 2016). "7:The Ptolemaic Period (332–30 BCE)". The Ancient Egyptian economy, 3000-30 BCE. Cambridge, England: Cambridge University Press. ISBN 9781107113367.
- Robinson, Carlos. Francis. (2019). "Queen Arsinoë II, the Maritime Aphrodite and Early Ptolemaic Ruler Cult". Chapter: Naval Power, the Ptolemies and the Maritime Aphrodite. A thesis submitted for the degree of Master of Philosophy. University of Queensland. Australia.
- Sidebotham, Steven E. (1986). Roman Economic Policy in the Erythra Thalassa: 30 B.C.-A.D. 217. Leiden, Netherlands.: BRILL. ISBN 9789004076440.
- Sidebotham, Steven E. (2019). Berenike and the Ancient Maritime Spice Route. Berkeley, California, United States.: University of California Press. ISBN 9780520303386.
