= League of the Islanders =

Ancient federal league of Greek city-states on the Cyclades islands

Map of the Cyclades

The League of the Islanders (Ancient Greek: τὸ κοινὸν τῶν νησιωτῶν, romanized: to koinon tōn nēsiōtōn) or Nesiotic League was a federal league (koinon) of ancient Greek city-states encompassing the Cyclades islands in the Aegean Sea. Organized under the auspices of Antigonus Monophthalmus in c. 314/3 BC, it remained under Antigonid control until c. 287 BC. It then passed under the aegis of the Ptolemaic Kingdom until Ptolemaic control over the central Aegean collapsed and the League was dissolved sometime in the mid-3rd century BC. The Cycladic islands reverted to independence, except for a few that passed under Macedonian control. The league was re-established ("Second Nesiotic League") under the leadership of Rhodes in c. 200 BC, and survived until c. 167 BC.

== History ==
The history of the League of the Islanders is relatively obscure, as no literary sources about it have survived. The only evidence comes from inscriptions. In 314/3 BC, Antigonus I Monophthalmus sent a fleet under his nephew Dioscurides to the Aegean islands, in order to defend them against the fleet of Ptolemy I and secure their allegiance to his cause. Although a fragmentary inscription from the League of the Islanders, typically dated to 306 BC, is often cited as evidence for the League's foundation, modern scholarship tends to place its establishment in the immediate aftermath of Dioscurides's campaign in 314/3 BC. The League was centred on Delos and stood under the protection of Antigonus, in whose honour annual games, the Antigoneia (Ἀντιγόνεια), after 306 BC alternating with games (Δημητρίεια, Dēmētrieia) in honour of Antigonus' son Demetrius Poliorcetes, were celebrated. Despite the defeat and death of Antigonus at the Battle of Ipsus in 301 BC, Demetrius retained control of the Antigonid fleet and thus of the League until c. 287/6 BC, when he was defeated and captured by Seleucus I. As a result, the islands passed under the hegemony of the Ptolemaic Kingdom, and the games were renamed as Sotēria Ptolemaia (Σωτήρια Πτολεμαῖα) and Philadelphia (Φιλαδέλφεια) in honour of Ptolemy I Soter and his son Ptolemy II Philadelphus.

The islands remained under Ptolemaic control until sometime in the middle of the 3rd century BC. The last documents pertaining to the League date approximately to the second quarter of the century; no nēsiarchos is attested after c. 260 BC, and the number of Ptolemaic offerings to Delos also drops off sharply at the same time. This indicates that the League collapsed, and the Ptolemies lost control of the Aegean, either during the Chremonidean War (268/7–261) or the Second Syrian War (260–253). Modern research connects this with the Ptolemaic naval defeats at the hands of the Macedonians and the Rhodians at Cos, Ephesus, and Andros—the precise dating of these battles has been heavily disputed among historians, but they are now usually dated to 261 BC, c. 258 BC, and 246/5 BC respectively. It appears that when Ptolemaic control was first interrupted, after Ephesus, the Rhodians stepped into the power vacuum, concluding alliances with some of the islands like Ios. Ptolemaic control was possibly re-asserted to some degree after the end of the Second Syrian War, and a Ptolemaia festival was once again celebrated in 249 and 246 BC, but the evidence is meager. As the historian Gary Reger writes, the celebration of the festival "can be attributed as much to piety and tradition as to advertisement of political hegemony". At any rate, the Ptolemaic position collapsed completely after Andros, both as a result of the military losses as due to the lack of strategic interest: unlike earlier in the century, when the Cyclades had served as a springboard for interference in the Greek mainland, at this point the Ptolemies had more vital concerns in the Levant and Asia Minor to pursue. Consequently, except for Thera, where they maintained a garrison, the Ptolemies abandoned the central Aegean. Many scholars, like William Woodthorpe Tarn and Maurice Holleaux, suggested that the Ptolemaic withdrawal resulted in a Macedonian hegemony over the Cyclades, while others, like Hendrik van Gelder, or P. M. Fraser and G. E. Bean, posited a Rhodian hegemony, either in direct succession of the Ptolemies, or, more often, after the 230s/220s BC. Reger, however, considers that the available epigraphic and other evidence shows few indications of a Rhodian predominance, while the Macedonian kings seem to have limited their interest to the islands closest to the Greek mainland—Macedonian control is attested for Andros and possibly Keos and Kythnos, with some influence, probably temporary, in Amorgos and Paros in the direct aftermath of the Battle of Andros—and the panhellenic sanctuary at Delos. According to Reger, by and large the individual Cycladic islands appear to have remained free and autonomous for the rest of the century.

In the meantime, Rhodes rose to become the chief naval power in the Aegean and even beyond. In order to protect their political and commercial interests, such as the grain trade, where Rhodes held a dominant position, the Rhodians were active against pirates such as Demetrius of Pharos or the Cretan cities and the Aetolian League; both of the latter secretly sponsored by King Philip V of Macedon. By c. 220 BC, according to Polybius (The Histories, IV.47.1), the Rhodians "were considered the supreme authority in maritime matters" and were called upon by merchants to intervene in cases such as the imposition of tolls by the Byzantines on passage of ships through the Bosporus. In 201 BC, during the Cretan War, Philip V of Macedon subdued the Cyclades at the head of his fleet, but already in the next year, the Rhodians took over of most of the islands except for the Macedonian-garrisoned islands of Andros, Paros, and Kythnos. Followed by further Macedonian setbacks in the Second Macedonian War (200–197 BC), the Cycladic islands, already bound individually to Rhodes by treaties of alliance, were soon after—an exact date cannot be ascertained—formed into a "Second Nesiotic League" under the hegemony of Rhodes. The motivations for Rhodes' move are unclear, but the historian Kenneth Sheedy has suggested that they stemmed at least partly from a desire to preempt other powers, whether the Kingdom of Pergamon or the Roman Republic, from establishing control over the area. Unlike the original League however, the Second League appears to have been a more voluntary association. The Second Nesiotic League is commonly held to have lasted until the end of Rhodian independence at the conclusion of the Third Macedonian War in 167 BC, but Sheedy suggests that it may have started to disintegrate earlier, as the Rhodians focused their attention on maintaining their grip over their Asian holdings and could no longer afford to maintain the costly hegemony over the Cyclades.

== Institutions ==
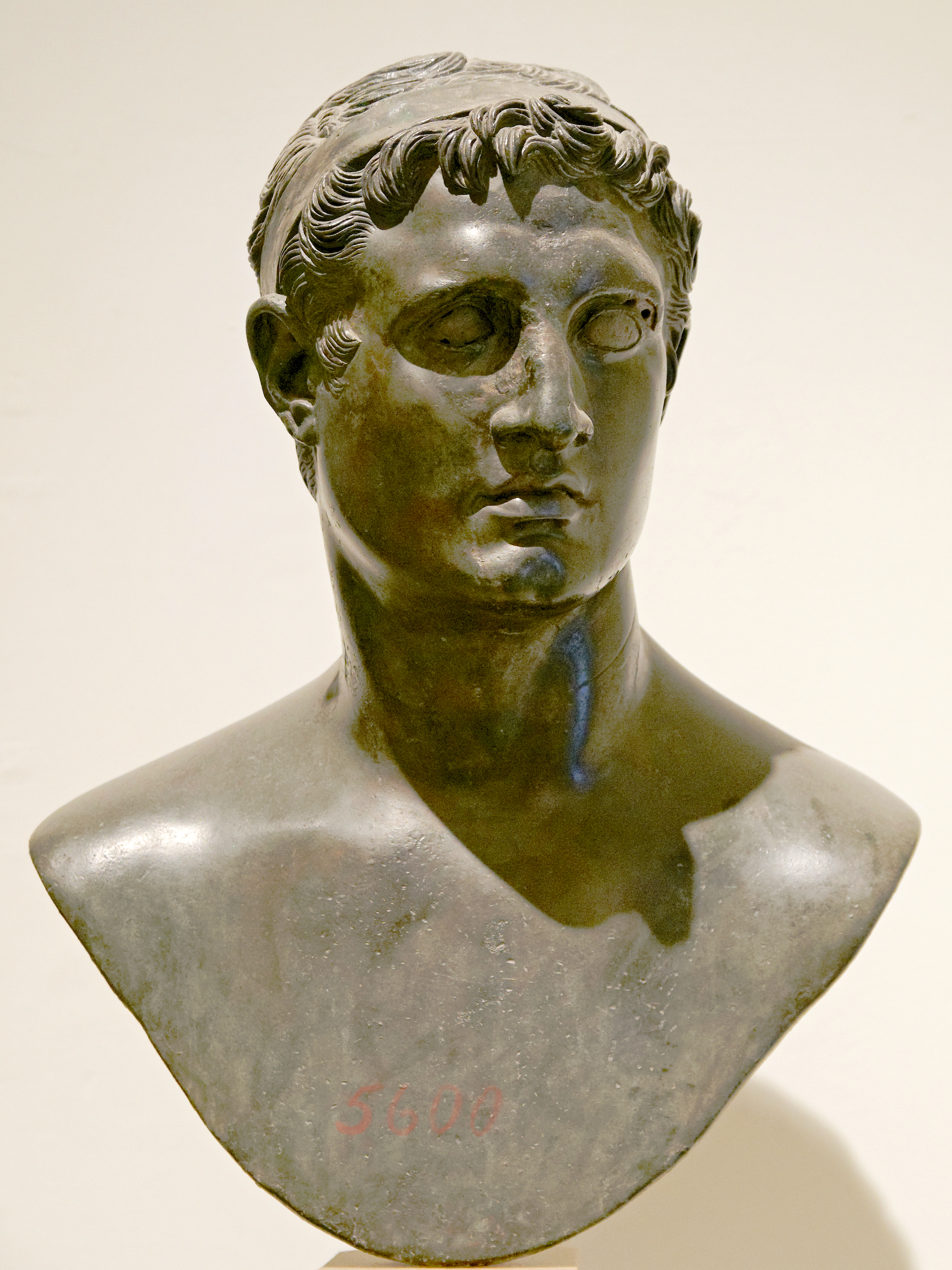
Bust of Ptolemy II Philadelphus

The League's institutions are well attested through a series of inscriptions for its Ptolemaic period, but it appears that the main characteristics were present already under Antigonus, and according to Richard Billows "the evidence for the Ptolemaic period can be used (with due caution) for the Antigonid period" as well. As Walther Schwahn commented, the constitution of the League of Islanders shows "distinct differences" from the constitutions of other contemporary Greek leagues, since "the League did not exist in the interests of its members, but to the advantage of a powerful patron". The exact membership of the League can not be determined with accuracy, but it certainly comprised Mykonos, Kythnos, Keos, and probably also Ios under Antigonus, while Naxos, Andros, Amorgos, and Paros are also attested under the Ptolemies. It is possible, but unlikely, that Samos and others of the Southern Sporades were also members during the Ptolemaic period. The membership of the sacred island of Delos, which played a central role in the League, has been disputed by Walther Kolbe, who argued that Delos remained independent of the League; most scholars however consider it to have been a full member of the League.

The League was headed by the nēsiarchos (νησίαρχος, "ruler of the islands") and a council (συνέδριον, synedrion). Unlike similar leagues, there is no evidence for an assembly of the citizens, probably since the distances made this impractical. The League had a strongly federal character, exemplified by the fact that the conferment of citizenship by any member automatically conferred citizenship in all other member states. There was no distinct League citizenship, but the League could grant foreign benefactors the citizenship for each of its members, as well as the rights of proxenia, prosodos, and asylia. In effect, this arrangement meant that "citizens of the member states enjoyed isopolity in each other's communities" (Billows).

The League's centre in Antigonid and Ptolemaic times was the sacred island of Delos, where the annual festivals were held, and where the synedrion assembled—a single, and probably exceptional, convocation by the Ptolemaic commander Philocles on Samos is also attested—and where its decrees were set up. In the Rhodian period, where Delos was not a member of the League, the synedrion assembled on Tenos. As the League's sole collective organ, the synedrion was a sort of legislative council with representatives (σύνεδροι, synedroi) appointed by the member states. It assembled on an ad hoc basis. Since no chairman is mentioned, it was probably headed by the nēsiarchos. The synedrion awarded honours and distinctions to benefactors, and levied both regular and extraordinary financial contributions (συντάξεις, syntaxeis or εἰσφοραί, eisphorai) for maintenance of the League's military and for the common festivals. These funds were administered by a treasurer (ταμίας, tamias). Surplus funds were available for other projects, e.g. the setting up of the League's decrees on inscribed stelae in the member states. In another indication of the Leagues' federal character, the synedrion could not only require financial contributions from its members, but also punish them for non-compliance. In practice, both the League as well as the member states often had to resort to taking loans from the Sanctuary of Apollo on Delos to cover expenses. The synedrion also appears to have appointed the overseers (ἐπιμεληταὶ, epimelētai) for the festivals and the sacrifices to Ptolemy Soter and Ptolemy Philadelphos, as well as arbitrators for judicial disputes between member states.

The nēsiarchos was appointed by the League's suzerain king, and, again in contrast to most other such leagues, was not an islander. He wielded executive power and was responsible for carrying out the synedrion's decisions, collect the member states' contributions, command the League military, and safeguard shipping in the Aegean. Only a handful are known by name: Apollodorus, son of Apollonius of Cyzicus, who was nēsiarchos sometime before 279, perhaps during the last years of Antigonid control; Bakchon, nēsiarchos in c. 279–276; and Hermias, possibly from Halicarnassus, attested only once in 267. Under Rhodian hegemony, he was replaced by a Rhodian archōn "in charge of the islands and the islands' ships" (ἐπί τε τῶν νήσων καὶ τῶν πλοίων τῶν νησιωτικῶν). The history of the League shows a number of cases of direct intervention by the suzerain power, often irrespective of local laws. In addition, both the Ptolemies and later the Rhodians secured some islands by installing appointed governors (ἐπιστάται, epistatai). Elsewhere the traditional institutions of a Greek polis remained in force.

== Sources ==
- Billows, Richard A. (1990). Antigonos the One-Eyed and the Creation of the Hellenistic State. Berkeley and Los Angeles, California: University of California Press. ISBN 0-520-20880-3.
- Buraselis, Kostas (2015). "Federalism and the sea. The koina of the Aegean islands". In Beck, Hans; Funke, Peter (eds.). Federalism in Greek Antiquity. Cambridge: Cambridge University Press. pp. 358–376. ISBN 978-0-521-19226-2.
- Kolbe, Walther (1930). "The Neutrality of Delos". The Journal of Hellenic Studies. 50 (1): 20–29. doi:10.2307/626160. ISSN 2041-4099. JSTOR 626160.
- König, Werner (1910). Der Bund der Nesioten; ein Beitrag zur Geschichte der Kykladen und benachbarten Inseln im Zeitalter des Hellenismus. Halle: Wischan & Brukhardt.
- Meadows, Andrew (2013). "The Ptolemaic League of the Islanders". In Buraselis, Kostas; Stefanou, Mary; Thompson, Dorothy J. (eds.). The Ptolemies, the Sea and the Nile: Studies in Waterborne Power. Cambridge University Press. pp. 19–38. ISBN 9781107033351.
- Merker, Irwin L. (1970). "The Ptolemaic Officials and the League of the Islanders". Historia. 19 (2): 141–160. ISSN 0018-2311. JSTOR 4435128.
- Reger, Gary (1994). "The Political History of the Kyklades 260–200 B.C.". Historia. 43 (1): 32–69. ISSN 0018-2311. JSTOR 4436314.
- Schwahn, Walther (1931). "Sympoliteia". Realencyclopädie der Classischen Altertumswissenschaft. Vol. Band IV, Halbband 7, Stoa–Symposion. col. 1171–1266.
- Sheedy, Kenneth A. (1996). "The Origins of the Second Nesiotic League and the Defence of Kythnos". Historia. 45 (4): 423–449. ISSN 0018-2311. JSTOR 4436440.
- Tarn, William Woodthorpe (1911). "Nauarch and Nesiarch". The Journal of Hellenic Studies. 31: 251–259.
