= Patroclus (admiral) =

Ptolemaic admiral

Patroclus, son of Patron
- Native name: Πάτροκλος
- Allegiance: Ptolemaic Kingdom
- Active: c. 271–261 BC
- Rank: strategos
- Conflicts: Chremonidean War

Patroclus (Ancient Greek: Πάτροκλος), also spelled Patroklos, was a leading official and admiral of the Ptolemaic Kingdom. He is best known for his activity during the Chremonidean War (267–261 BC), when he commanded the navy sent to Greece by Ptolemy II. His early career is obscure, but it must have been distinguished enough for him to rise to the chief priesthood of Alexander and the Theoi Adelphoi in 271/270 BC. After the outbreak of the Chremonidean War, he led a diplomatic and military expedition to the Aegean Sea that expanded Ptolemaic control by establishing bases at Crete, Ceos, Thera, Attica and the Argolid. From these bases he tried, without much success, to aid the Athenians against Antigonus II Gonatas, King of Macedon. He may have been the defeated Ptolemaic commander at the Battle of Cos, which marked the end of Ptolemaic thalassocracy.

== Early life and career ==
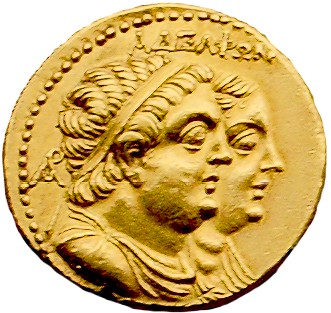
Octadrachm showing Ptolemy II Philadelphus (front), and his sister/wife Arsinoe II

Patroclus' early life is obscure; nothing is known of his family apart from the name of his father, Patron. He certainly held various offices in the service of Ptolemy II, in which he must have distinguished himself for his ability and loyalty, particularly to Ptolemy's sister and second wife, Arsinoe II, before being appointed to the prestigious post of eponymous priest of the deified Alexander the Great and the Sibling Gods (Theoi Adelphoi, the deified Ptolemy II and Arsinoe) in 271/270 BC. His appointment to that office has been seen by some scholars as either a reward, or an incentive, for his execution of the poet Sotades, who in his compositions denounced the incestuous marriage between Ptolemy II and Arsinoe. Sotades was imprisoned in Alexandria, but managed to escape to the "island of Kaunos", until Patroclus captured him and ordered him to be placed in a leaden box and dropped him into the sea.

== Chremonidean War ==
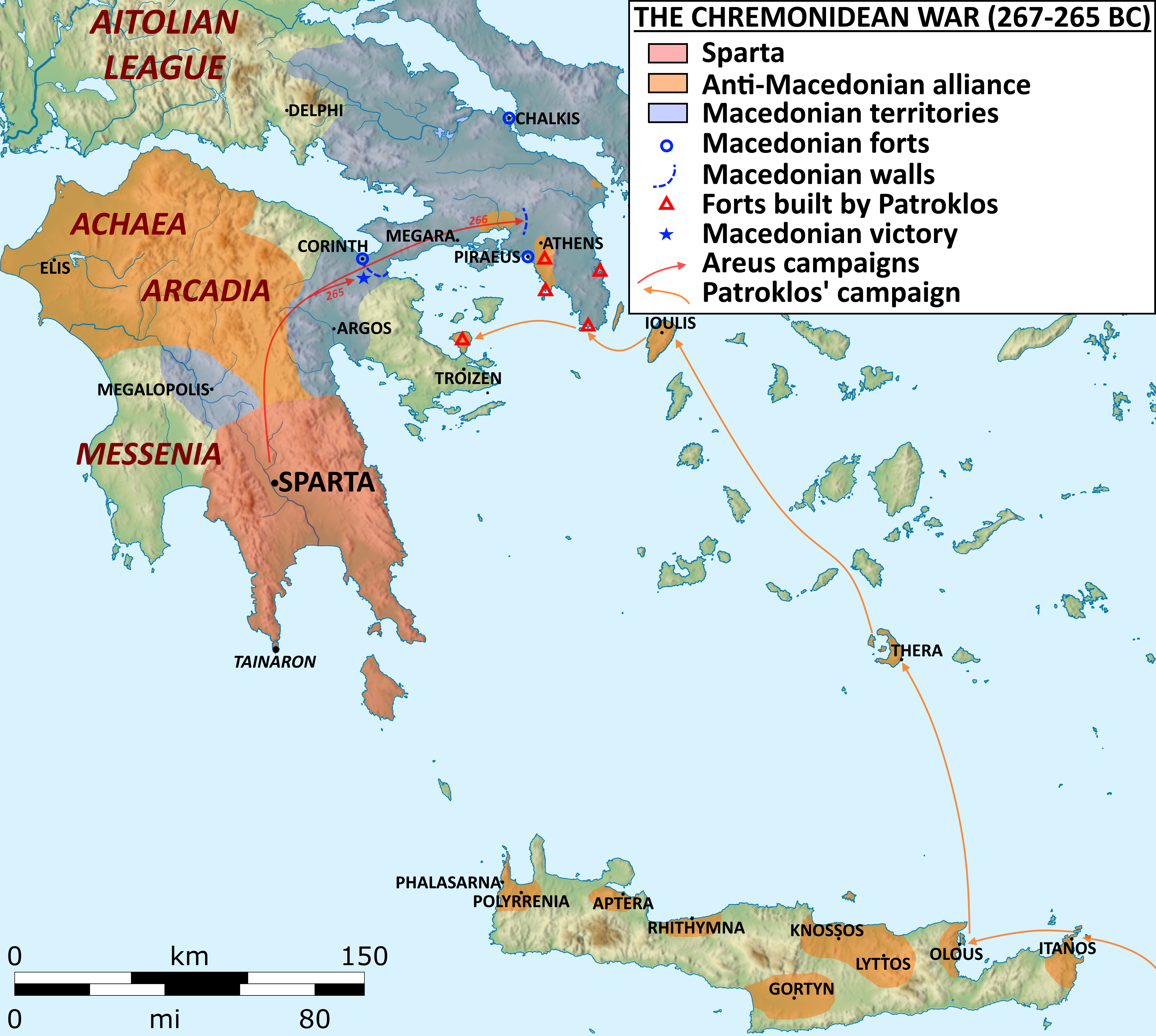
First stage of the Chremonidean War (267-265 BC), with Patroclus' possible route from Egypt to Attica.

The Chremonidean War, which broke out in late 268 BC, provides the stage for the better known part of Patroclus' career. Patroclus has frequently been called nauarchos (admiral) by modern studies, beginning with the British classicist William Woodthorpe Tarn, who in the early 20th century conceived the Ptolemaic nauarchos as having been an office of almost viceregal authority, held by men like Philocles, the king of Sidon, for terms of ten years each. As the French historian Marcel Launey has shown, the title is applied to Patroclus only once in ancient sources, by the 2nd-century AD geographer Pausanias; all contemporary or later literary and epigraphical sources refer to him as strategos (general), which must have been his actual title. Indeed, according to the German classicist Hans Hauben, his Macedonian origin seems to argue for a previous career in the army rather than in the navy. The actual extent of Patroclus' authority is a matter of dispute in current scholarship, but it is clear that he enjoyed broad powers over the other Ptolemaic commanders and their allies in the Aegean Sea.

In early 267 BC, he headed a large Ptolemaic embassy to Crete, with the aim of securing his master's influence there, as well as bases for operations in the Aegean Sea. Patroclus is attested by name in two cities, Itanus and Olus. He was honoured with the proxenia and the title of benefactor by both cities, as well as with the citizenship of Itanus—a rare honour. In Olus, his fellow envoys are also attested: Callicrates of Samos, his predecessor as eponymous priest, and seven others. According to Launey's interpretation, it was at that point that Patroclus went to "the island of Kaudos", as he emends Kaunos, where he executed Sotades. Launey's emendation has long been accepted by most scholars, but the problems of chronology and geography render "a definitive solution impossible", according to Hauben.

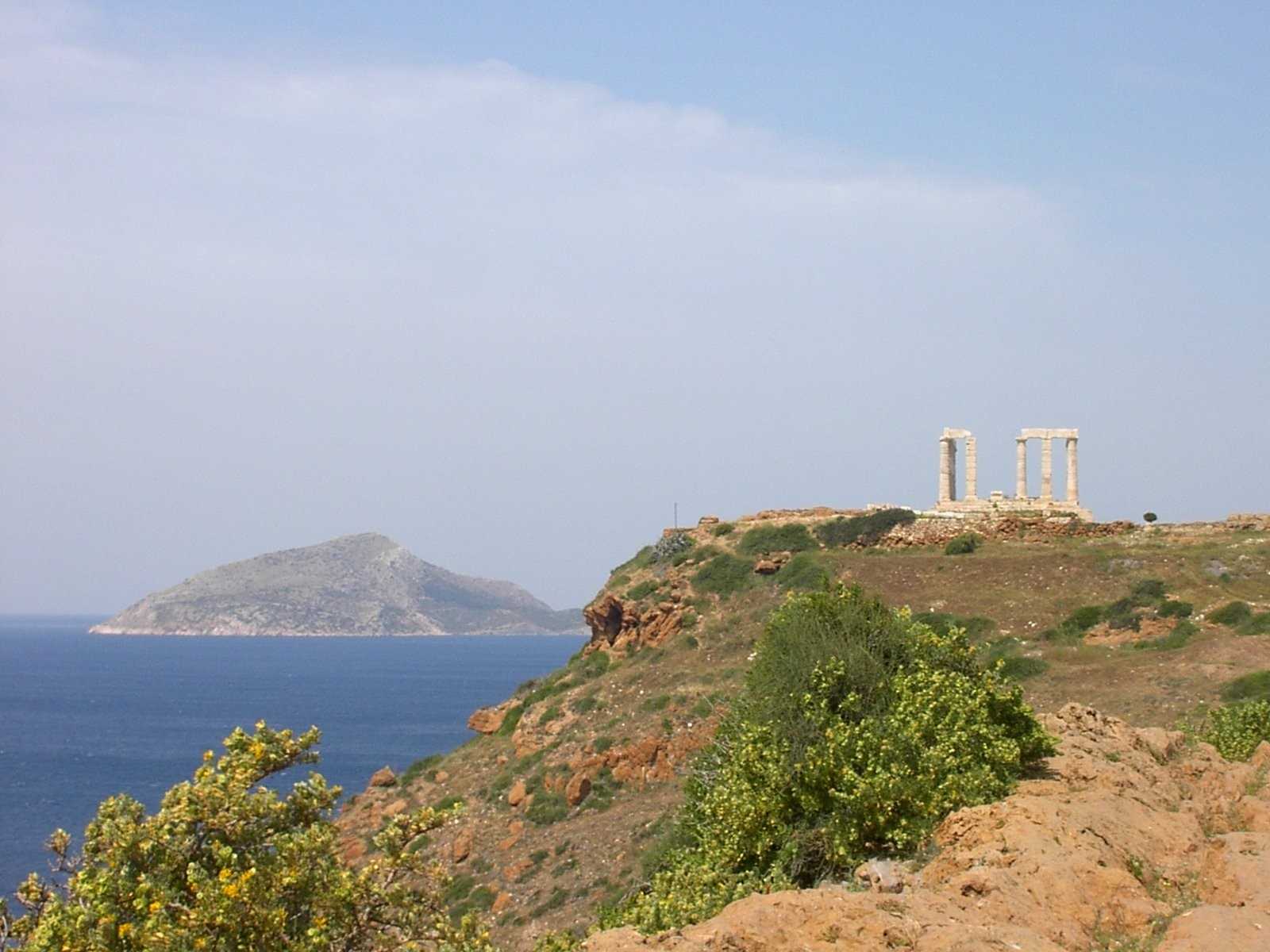
The "Island of Patroclus", seen from Sounion

Epigraphical evidence suggests that Patroclus then visited Ceos. He made Ioulis, one of the four cities of the island, his headquarters, and apparently refounded the city of Koressos, naming it after Queen Arsinoe. A garrison was installed on the island, under the epistates Hieron of Syracuse. While there, Patroclus received a request from the citizens of Thera who were troubled by internal strife. He selected a board of five judges from Ioulis, to put the affairs of Thera in order. Patroclus also appointed an epistates, Apollodorus, probably also from Ioulis, but his exact role, i.e., whether his role was temporary, linked with the mission of the judges, or as commander of a permanent garrison on the island, is unclear. At about the same time, Patroclus expanded his ring of naval bases around the Greek mainland, occupying Methana in the Argolid, which he also renamed Arsinoe. As the Athenian port of Piraeus was probably still in the hands of an Antigonid Macedonian garrison, he also fortified an uninhabited island off the coast of Attica, named after him "Isle of Patroclus". At about this time, Patroclus dedicated a phiale to the panhellenic sanctuary at Delos.

These moves served to tighten Ptolemaic control over the Aegean, but his active intervention in the war was unsuccessful. In 266 BC, Patroclus with his troops tried to aid the Athenians. The literary references to the subsequent events are limited to brief statements by Pausanias, which indicate that the Ptolemaic troops proved ineffective. Patroclus requested the assistance of the Spartan king Areus I, excusing his inability to take the offensive alone with the comment that his men were native Egyptians and sailors. As Hans Hauben comments, this comment may reveal more about "a certain Greek (and Macedonian) milieu" and its "visceral contempt for native Egyptians" than the quality of the Egyptian troops. Nevertheless, archaeological evidence on the island of Patroklos and other fortified sites in Attica suggest that Patroclus' involvement was more extensive than implied by Pausanias: coins, pottery shards, and remnants of fortifications point to a Ptolemaic presence not only on the southeastern shores of Attica, such as the peninsula of Koroni or a coastal fort in the deme of Atene, but further inland as well, in Ilioupoli and Mount Hymettus, and on the southwestern shores, at Vouliagmeni. This presence implies an attempt to neutralize the fortress of Sounion on the extreme south of Attica, which was probably also under Antigonid control, as well as an effort to supply Athens overland, bypassing the Antigonid-controlled Piraeus. In the event, although the Spartan army may have come as close as Kamatero, they could not advance further, and withdrew. Patroclus' envisaged two-pronged attack on the Antigonid army did not materialize. Epigraphical evidence from the coastal Athenian outpost of Rhamnous, which was being harassed by the Antigonid army and pirates collaborating with them, or simply taking advantage of the general chaos, also attests to the fact that Athenian and Ptolemaic attempts to safeguard Attica were not wholly effective.

In 265/4 BC, Areus once again tried to cross the Isthmus of Corinth and aid the beleaguered Athenians, but the Macedonian king Antigonus II Gonatas concentrated his forces against him and defeated the Spartans, with Areus himself among the dead. Despite the presence of Patroclus and his fleet, it appears that Ptolemy II hesitated to fully commit himself to the conflict. The reasons for this reluctance are unclear, but it appears that, especially in the last years of the war, Ptolemaic involvement was limited to financial support for the Greek city-states and naval assistance. The end of Ptolemaic involvement may be related to the Battle of Cos, whose chronology is much disputed by modern scholars. Almost nothing is known about the events of the battle, except that Antigonus II Gonatas, although outnumbered, led his fleet to defeat Ptolemy's unnamed commanders. A surviving anecdote where Patroclus taunted the Macedonian king for his lack of mastery over the sea has been interpreted by some scholars, such as Hans Hauben, as indicating that Cos belongs to the Chremonidean War and was fought around 262/1 BC, with Patroclus in command of the Ptolemaic fleet. Others, however, place the battle around 255 BC, at the time of the Second Syrian War. Whatever the actual events, it is clear that Cos marked the end of absolute Ptolemaic thalassocracy in the Aegean.

== Sources ==
- Hauben, Hans (2013). "Callicrates of Samos and Patroclus of Macedon, champions of Ptolemaic thalassocracy". In Buraselis, Kostas; Stefanou, Mary; Thompson, Dorothy J. (eds.). The Ptolemies, the Sea and the Nile: Studies in Waterborne Power. Cambridge University Press. pp. 39–65. ISBN 9781107033351.
- Launey, Marcel (1945). "Études d'histoire hellénistique, II: L'exécution de Sotades et l'expédition de Patroklos dans la mer Égée (266 av. J.-C.)". Revue des études anciennes (in French). 47: 33–45. doi:10.3406/rea.1945.3303.
- O'Neil, James L. (2008). "A Re-Examination of the Chremonidean War". In McKechnie, Paul R.; Guillaume, Philippe (eds.). Ptolemy II Philadelphus and his World. Leiden and Boston: BRILL. pp. 65–90. ISBN 9789004170896.
