= Pelops (disambiguation) =

Pelops (/ˈpiːlɒps, ˈpɛlɒps/; Greek: Πέλοψ "dark eyes" or "dark face", derived from pelios 'dark' and ops 'face, eye') may refer to:

- Pelops, king of Pisa and son of Tantalus in Greek mythology
- Pelops (son of Agamemnon), figure in Greek mythology
- Pelops, son of Alexander, 3rd-century BC Ptolemaic official
- Pelops, son of Pelops, 3rd-century BC Ptolemaic official
- Pelops of Sparta, 3rd-century BC king of Sparta of the Eurypontid dynasty
