= Dioscorides (disambiguation) =

Pedanius Dioscorides (c. AD 40–90) was a Greek physician, pharmacologist, and botanist.

Dioscorides or Dioscurides may also refer to:

- Dioscurides (nephew of Antigonus I) (fl. 314–313 BC), admiral during the Wars of the Diadochi
- Dioscorides (Stoic) (fl. 225 BC), Stoic philosopher
- Dioscorides (poet) (3rd century BC), Hellenistic epigrammatist
- Dioscurides (gem cutter) (1st century AD), Roman lapidarist
