= ZPE =

ZPE may refer to:

- Zero-point energy
- ZPE Programming Environment
- Zeitschrift für Papyrologie und Epigraphik
