= Callicrates of Samos =

Commander of the Ptolemaic navy during the Second Syrian War

- Καλλικράτης
- Military career
- Allegiance: Ptolemaic Kingdom
- Service years: 270–250 BC
- Rank: Admiral
- Unit: Aegean Fleet
- Conflicts: Second Syrian War

Callicrates or Kallikrates (Greek: Καλλικράτης), was a fleet commander (nauarchos) of the Ptolemaic navy, who served under Ptolemy II Philadelphus during the Second Syrian War from 270 to 250 BC.

== Career ==
Callicrates originated from Samos. He arrived at the Ptolemaic court in Alexandria, Egypt and received the aulic rank of philos ("friend") of the sibling monarchs Ptolemy II and Arsinoë II, rising to high offices and dignities. In the fourteenth year of reign (272/271 BC) of the co monarchs, he officiated as a priest of Alexander and he was the first a priest of the "sibling Goddess Arsinoë". For a period of 20 years, between the years 270 to 250 BC he was appointed as fleet commander in the Ptolemaic navy, this has been attested on inscriptions on statues that have been found honouring him.

He was commander of the Ptolemaic Aegean Fleet and was engaged in naval operations during the Second Syrian War (260–253 BC) where he suffered successive defeats against the allied forces of Antiochus II Theos of the Seleucid Empire and Antigonus II Gonatas of the Kingdom of Macedon.

During the lifetime of Arsinoe II the sibling monarchs and Callicrates received a tribute from his home island of Samos. Around the year 257 BC he was instructed to build a temple to Isis and Anubis at Canopus on behalf of Ptolemy II. That same year, he instructed his agent Zoilos to write to the chief finance minister of Egypt, Apollonius in regard to his request to pay the navy tax, and to also remind Apollonius that both Oromachos and Deinon were liable for the same tax demand.

Callicrates is also known for the erection of a temple on Cape Zephyrion near Alexandria, where Arsinoë II was worshipped as Aphrodite. This foundation is documented in a poem by Posidippus, and became one of the most important cult sites of Hellenistic Egypt. At Olympia, Greece he had constructed what must have been enormous statues of both King Ptolemy II and his sibling (sister wife) Queen Arsinoe II that stood on separate bases reportedly 24 meters wide.

Callicrates himself was honoured by statues at Delos, Palai-Paphos and Kourion. As a "benefactor" of the city of Olous in Crete he received honorary citizenship (proxenia); he had probably been there on a diplomatic mission with about eight men about the time of the Chremonidean War.

== Sources ==
- Hauben, Hans (2013). "Callicrates of Samos and Patroclus of Macedon, champions of Ptolemaic thalassocracy". In Buraselis, Kostas; Stefanou, Mary; Thompson, Dorothy J. (eds.). The Ptolemies, the Sea and the Nile: Studies in Waterborne Power. Cambridge University Press. pp. 39–65. ISBN 9781107033351.
