= Battle of Ephesus =

The Battle of Ephesus may refer to:

- Battle of Ephesus (498 BC), in the Ionian Revolt
- Battle of Ephesus (406 BC), between Athenians and Peloponnesians
- Battle of Ephesus (ca. 258 BC), between the Rhodian and Ptolemaic fleets
- Battle of Ephesus (1147), during the Second Crusade
