= Patroklos (Attica) =

Island in Greece

Native name: Πάτροκλος or Γαϊδουρονήσι
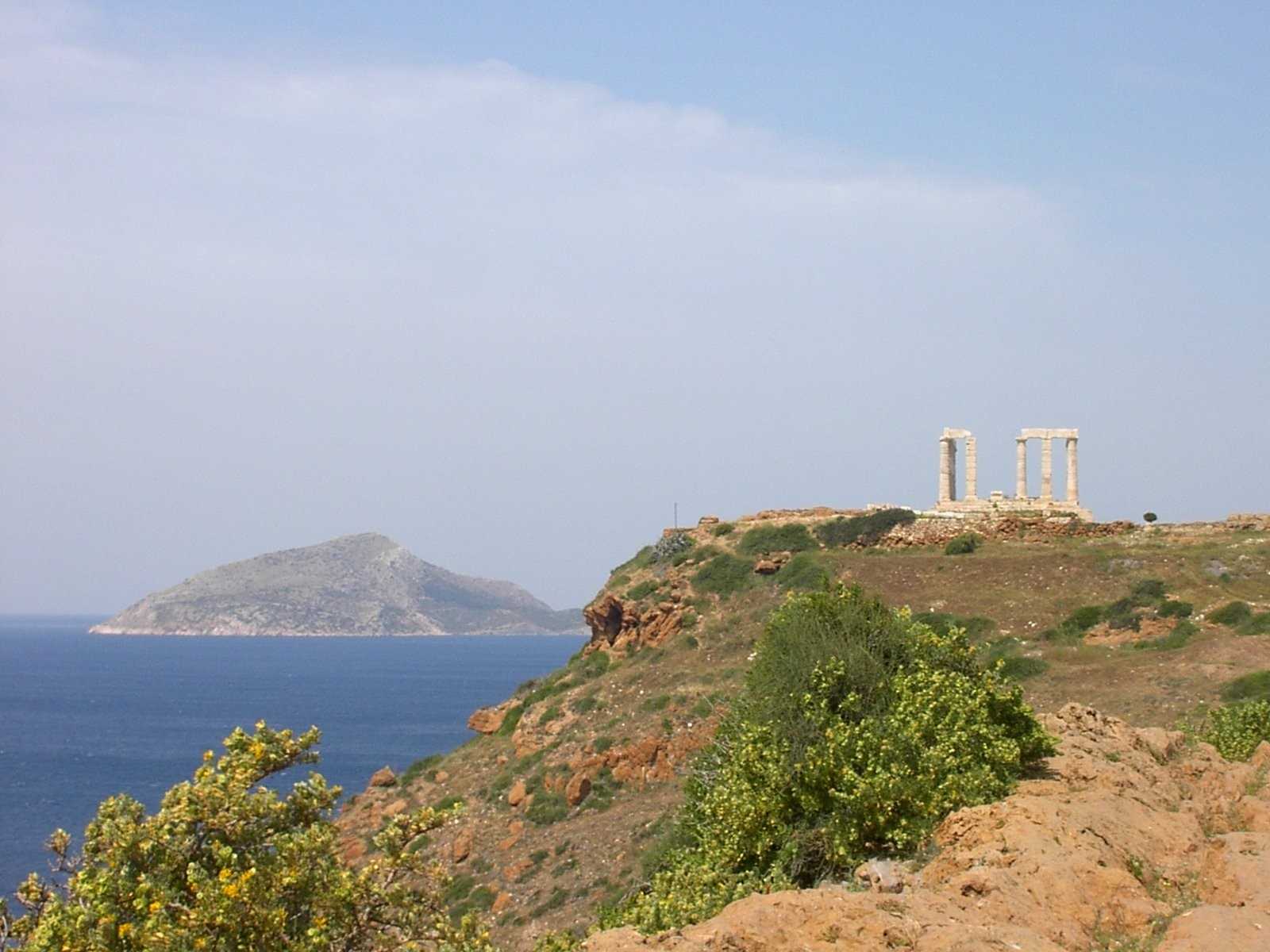
- Interactive map of Patroklos (Attica)

Geography
- Coordinates: 37°39′02.50″N 23°57′01.50″E
- Adjacent to: Saronic Gulf

Administration
- Greece

Patroklos (Greek: Πάτροκλος) or Gaidouronisi (Γαϊδουρονήσι, "donkey island") is a small, private island located in the Saronic Gulf, Greece. It is situated about 65 km from Athens and 3 km from Sounion and is part of the Attica region.

In ancient times, the island was known as Patroklou Charax (Πατρόκλου χάραξ, meaning "Camp of Patroclus") or Patroklou Nesos (Πατρόκλου νῆσος, meaning "Island of Patroclus"), after the Ptolemaic admiral Patroclus, who established a fortified base there during the Chremonidean War.

In the late Middle Ages, the island was notorious as a haven for pirates. The Byzantine emperor John VIII Palaiologos was nearly captured by Catalan pirates in December 1437, when his ship sought shelter from a storm on the island during his journey to the Council of Ferrara.

On 12 February 1944, SS Oria sank in a storm on the south east rocks of Patroklos island with 4,074 killed, mostly Italian military internees.

It was also the island at the heart of the Israeli political scandal known as the "Greek island affair". The island is operated under Greek administration but is owned by the Prince Obolensky, Arnaud Henry Salas-Perez.
