= Sanctuary of Arsinoe Aphrodite at Cape Zephyrion =

Temple of Aphrodite in Alexandria

Coordinates: 31.268941°N 29.987265°E

The Temple to Arsinoe Aphrodite at Cape Zephyrion was a sanctuary commissioned around 279 BCE by Kallikrates, the commander of the Ptolemaic Naval Fleet. A Graeco-Macedonian Ptolemaic Queen of Egypt, Arsinoe II was directly involved in public affairs, war planning, and public and private ritual rites. As Arsinoe II was involved in cult worship during her lifetime both alone and alongside her husband and brother Ptolemy II, after her death, Arsinoe was deified– primarily associated as an aspect or incarnation of Aphrodite but sometimes influenced by Demeter and Isis. The sanctuary was built on Cape Zephyrion in wider Alexandria, serving as a temple for unmarried women, sailors and other sea laborers to beseech the deity for smooth traveling on the sea and in love. Thought to be located between the Canopic mouth of the Nile Delta and Pharos beach, the sanctuary served to reiterate Ptolemaic dynastic rule through the presentation of the deified Ptolemaic queen as a protector of the Ptolemaic military and generational order through her influence of successful wedlock.

== History ==
In an epigram written by Poseidippos, Kallikrates the commander of the Ptolemaic Navy is honored as the commissioner of the Temple to Arsinoe as Aphrodite. Kallikrates commissioned the temple for Cape Zephyrion in 279 BCE, years after Arsinoe II's death in 270–268 BCE. The Ptolemies deified Arsinoe in Egypt, especially in Alexandria where members of the elite priests had interest in preserving the hegemony of the Ptolemaic dynasty. However, the royal family also created tax exemption incentives, inspiring priesthoods in inland Egypt, especially Memphis her birthplace, to keep the cult of Arsinoe II alive – a request that was accepted in order to gain prestige. Kallikrates cemented Arsinoe II's deification by creating this temple merging her with Aphrodite – ensuring that she not only was a deity in relation to her husband Ptolemy II, but also on her own. In Poseidippos's epigram – Kallikrates is described as creating the temple to Arsinoe Aphrodite to center her roles as goddess of love and seafaring. Kallikrates intended the temple to be as a sanctuary from the waves, a refuge for unmarried or “chaste” women seeking success in love, and sailors and naval warriors looking to request safe voyages. A clever religious-political move, the temple served as a reminder of the Ptolemies’ military power, as any and all boats stopping there would be either of the Ptolemaic fleet or would be reminded of it in requesting aid from the Ptolemized Aphrodite. The Temple was built on the coast so as to provide easy access from the sea, and so the temple could be seen from the sea and vice versa.

In 245 BCE, Berenike II offered a lock of her own hair to Arsinoe Aphrodite at the sanctuary, to celebrate the safe return of her husband Ptolemy III Euergetes from the Third Syrian War. While this event did reportedly happen, the story was mythologized by poets Callimachus of Cyrene and later Catullus. The story evolved into one where Berenike's lock was lifted to the heavens by Zephyros the West Wind, and Arsinoe Aphrodite transformed it into the constellation now known as Coma Berenices. The location of the offering at her mother-in-law Arsinoe II's sanctuary, served to show gratitude for the goddesses’ naval prowess and sea-calming aspects in returning her husband. Additionally, the episode at a former deified Ptolemaic Queen served to justify through the poems, Berenike's later deification.

In a poem by Callimachus, it is said that Selenaia the daughter of Kleinias went to the Temple at Cape Zephyrion to offer a nautilus to Arsinoe Aphrodite. The offering– nautiluses being sacred to Aphrodite– was given as an offering of thanks for her safe naval travel from Smyrna to Alexandria. However, the poem of Selenaia's offering also seems to indicate that her involvement with the cult may also have to do with her involvement in the love side of Arsinoe Aphrodite's cult and provides evidence that unmarried women went to Arsinoe Aphrodite's temple to beseech love.

== Creator ==
Kallikrates of Samos served as naurarch, or commander of the royal fleet, for the Ptolemies from the 270s BCE to the 250's BCE, and he enjoyed a great closeness to the Ptolemies with a close relationship to Ptolemy II himself. Due to their closeness, Kallikrates was chosen by Ptolemy II to be the first priest of the dynastic cults of the Theoi Adelphoi (deified Ptolemies) and the cult of Alexander. As a result, Kallikrates had a great amount of influence and power between the spheres of naval and religious. Kallikrates made offerings on behalf of the Theoi Adelphoi to the traditional Greek gods in different parts of Greece, but also established a temple to Anubis and Isis– dedicated to Ptolemy and Arsinoe, possibly trying to merge the two. It seems that Kallikrates's efforts to make offerings to ancient Greek gods on behalf of the Theoi Adelphoi was likely an attempt to ensure the normalization of the deification of the royal siblings, display their influence, and strengthen bonds between Alexandria and the Greek world. However, Kallikrates most famous action was his development of the sanctuary for Arsinoe Aphrodite. Kallikrates decision to solidify Arsinoe's identification with Aphrodite was a move on his part to cement her as an overseer of the Ptolemaic Navy-– creating a thinly veiled military cult. However, Kallikrates also intended the temple to be a place for unmarried women to pray for love. Kallikrates intended the primary visitors of the temple to be Greek. For his influential roles in the navy and cultic offerings to Greek gods, Kallikrates was given statues throughout Greece.

== Architecture ==
The Sanctuary at Cape Zephyrion had three primary components. Built on the coast, the temple had a landing dock where worshippers could land their boats, or navy ships could rest. The docks led up to the temple itself, which was likely visible from the water. The exact architecture and decoration of the now-lost temple are unknown. However, the temple complex included an alsos– the Greek word for a grove. The grove outside the temple was a sacred part of the temple complex, likely intended for reflection and meditation related to Arsinoe Aphrodite.

== Cultic aspects and epithets ==
Arsinoe II's deity persona was almost entirely merged with Aphrodite, as the areas of the goddesses’ rule was the most advantageous for the Ptolemaic court. However, it's important to note the epithets to Aphrodite that were used for Arsinoe at the temple, to see which aspects of Aphrodite people came to worship Arsinoe for. Kallikrates the commissioner was said in poems by Poseidippus to be devoting the temple to Arsinoe Kypris, as well as Arsinoe Aphrodite Zephyritis. The explanation of these epithets, and others used in the cult of Arsinoe are as follows:

Kypris - Refers to an epithet for Aphrodite created by the people of Cyprus, which is the island on which Aphrodite first settled and made her home after being born from the Sea. Seeks to fuse Arsinoe and Aphrodite's origin story.

Zephyritis - Places Arsinoe Aphrodite as having the power of or being in league with Zephyros, the Greek deity of the West Wind. This epithet was used by Kallikrates and Poseidippus to highlight Arsinoe Aphrodite's control over the seas– giving her influence over the wind itself to guide ships safely or be their undoing. Seeks to reinforce Arsinoe's influence over oceanic travel and thus naval affairs.

Euploia - The smoother of waters. This Epithet spoke to Aphrodite's ability to soothe the rage of the waves and facilitate a peaceful ocean to cross. Papyrus's show that Arsinoe Aphrodite was addressed with this epithet to seek safe naval travel.

Ourania - Epigrams have shown that offerings were likely made to Arsinoe Aphrodite as Aphrodite's epithet Ourania, meaning protectress of marriage. This epithet would have been used in the side of the cult at Zephyrium that encouraged unmarried women to beseech Arsinoe Aphrodite for luck and protection in love, as well as to pray for successful wedlock. This function was wrapped up in the desire to present Arsinoe Aphrodite as a protectress and creator of Ptolemaic dynastic continuation, while influencing broader patriarchal roles. However, unmarried women were able to form their own connotations and connections with the goddess through this epithet.

Effect of the Temple

The desire of Kallikrates for the temple to serve as a merger of the religious, political, and navy did not go unappreciated. Poseidippus's epigrams mention Arsinoe's role as Aphrodite Zephyritis– associating her with Zephryos the West Wind. This connotation served to strengthen Arsinoe's positioning as a controller of the wind and sea, obviously becoming the patron of sailor's livelihoods in her control of their safe passage. As Poseidippus was poet at the court of the Ptolemies, it is clear that his poetics were used to help clarify Arsinoe's deification and inspire people to pray to her for their success in naval expeditions and battles. The Ptolemies had great interest in having people pray to Arsinoe to ensure their loyalty to the dynastic order of the Ptolemies. The Temple must have been a therapeutic rest stop for sailors and naval warriors of the royal fleet alike, allowing for individuals to form their own connection to and interpretation of Arsinoe's cult. However, Kallikrates’ intention to construct a naval cult that would prop up the hegemony of the Ptolemies is marked by how poets wrote about the place. Poseidippus's epigrams also mention fishermen and unmarried women approaching the temple. It seems that the Temple, though created for political gain, did have a faithful following, as evidenced by these epigrams as well as visitation and offering by Berenike II and Selenaia. Thus, we can assume that the temple's proximity to both Alexandria and the ocean allowed for an active cult in which both sailors and unmarried women found solace and prayed for protection on the sea and in love matters.

Ultimately, it is difficult to say the role Arsinoe played in her own divinification. During life, she was deified as part of the Theoi Adelphoi and was depicted as a divine royal on temple walls, but it is unclear whether Arsinoe played a specific role in her association with the navy. However, Ptolemy II sought to expand the Ptolemaic empire through his navy, and Arsinoe's image was used as a way of spiritualizing the naval-military desires of the royal family. Kallikrates's desire to create a temple merging the naval and the romantic sides of Aphrodite, was likely influenced by Ptolemy II's naval ambitions, as Kallikrates was both his right-hand man in naval and priestly areas. Thus, we can assume that Arsinoe II's deification and construction of a sanctuary was a political move to advertise Ptolemaic Naval influence and to ensure loyalty to the crown, though spiritual and personal reasons likely joined in the creation of the new Goddess. We can see that Arsinoe II's deification had an influence on naval expansion, as several ports around the world were named after her by the Ptolemy's. These ports in Lycia, Crete, Argolis, and Pamphylia showed that this naval depiction of Arsinoe was purposeful, and several powerful officers of the Ptolemaic Navy were instrumental in keeping Arsinoe II's cult alive. It is clear that the temple at Cape Zephyrion was a decisive construction that benefitted the Ptolemaic Navy and royal family just as much if not more than it helped ease the mind of sailors and unmarried women. While Arsinoe II's cult was followed actively, showing her divinity was acknowledged by individuals– it is also clear that her image played an active role in Ptolemaic naval expansion.
