= Seleucus, son of Bithys =

Ptolemaic governor of Cyprus and admiral in the second century BC

Seleukos (Ancient Greek: Σέλευκος; died c. 130 BC), son of Bithys, was a Ptolemaic governor of Cyprus and admiral in the second century BC.

== Life ==
Seleucus had citizenship of Alexandria and Rhodes (the latter was probably the result of an honorary grant of citizenship). In 157/156 BC, he was honoured at Delphi for his diplomatic intervention with King Ptolemy VI on behalf of the city. Probably immediately after the coronation of Ptolemy VIII in 145 BC, Seleucus was appointed governor (strategos) of Cyprus and ex officio high priest of the island. In honour of him, the priests of Aphrodite at Paphos dedicated a statue of him and a second statue was probably dedicated to him by the officers of the Cilician regiment of the Ptolemaic garrison on the island. By 141/140 BC at the latest, Seleucus had acquired the rank of admiral (nauarchos) in the Ptolemaic navy – as stated by at least three inscriptions. He retained the governorship and the admiralty until around 130 BC when he must have died at an advanced age. He was succeeded by Crocus.

== Family ==
Seleucus was married to Artemo I, daughter of Theodorus, who had the priestly role of 'basket-bearer' (kanephoros) of the deified Arsinoe II in Alexandria in 177/176 BC. She had a son and two daughters:

- Theodorus, who later also served as governor of Cyprus.
- Olympias I, priestess of Arsinoe III in Alexandria in 107/176 BC.
- Artemo II, priestess of Arsinoe III in Alexandria some time between 141 and 115 BC and priestess of Cleopatra III between 142 and 131 BC.

== Bibliography ==
- Roger S. Bagnall: The Administration of the Ptolemaic possessions outside Egypt. (1976) pp. 258–259.
- Willy Clarysse, E. van’t Dack: Prosopographia Ptolemaica III: Le clergé, le notariat, les tribunaux, no. 4984–8040 (PP III) (1956).
- Willy Clarysse: Prosopographia Ptolemaica. Vol. IX: Addenda et Corrigenda au volume III. (PP III/IX) (1981).
- Wilhelm Dittenberger: Orientis Graeci inscriptiones selectae. (OGIS) Vol. 1 (1903), No. 150–161, pp. 229–237.
- S. R. K. Glanville and T. C. Skeat: "Eponymous Priesthoods of Alexandria from 211 B.C." The Journal of Egyptian Archaeology. 40 (1954) pp. 45–58.
- Ludwig Koenen: "Kleopatra III. als Priesterin des Alexanderkultes (P. Colon. inv. nr. 5063)." Zeitschrift für Papyrologie und Epigraphik. 5 (1970) pp. 61–84.
- T. B. Mitford: "Seleucus and Theodorus." Opuscula Atheniensia. Vol. 1, 1953, pp. 130–171.
- T. B. Mitford: "The Hellenistic Inscriptions of Old Paphos." The Annual of the British School at Athens Vol. 56 (1961), pp. 1–41.
- Felix Staehelin "Seleukos 13" in Pauly–Wissowa II A.1 col. 1247.

Preceded by ?	Ptolemaic governor of Cyprus; 145 BC – c. 130 BC	Succeeded by Crocus
