= Helenus of Cyrene =

Ptolemaic governor of Cyprus

Helenos (Ancient Greek: Ἕλενος) was a Ptolemaic governor of Cyprus in the second century BC. He came from Cyrene and was the son of either a man called Apollonius or of Apollodorus the epistrategos of Thebais.

Helenus joined the service of Ptolemy VIII while he was ruling as king in Cyrene between 163 and 145 BC and then followed him to Alexandria when he became king of Egypt. During Ptolemy's civil war with Cleopatra II, Helenus must have followed the king when he withdrew to Cyprus. There he worked with the governor (strategos) Theodorus, serving in his staff as a kind of deputy governor of Cyprus. Among other things, he dedicated a statue to the governor and another one to an unnamed son of the governor.

In 118 BC, Theodorus was summoned to Alexandria and Helenus himself assumed the position of governor and high priest of Cyprus. At this time, the king's eldest son Ptolemy (later Ptolemy IX) resided on the island and Helenus also erected a statue in honour of him. Helenus himself received a statue from the priests of Aphrodite of Paphos. In 116 BC, Prince Ptolemy took over the governorship for himself, but when his father died later that year he departed for Alexandria to seize the kingship by force.

Ptolemy IX sent his younger brother, who would later rule as Ptolemy X, to Cyprus, where he formally assumed the position of governor. Helenus was appointed as the Prince's tutor (tropheus) and in practice he governed the island on Ptolemy's behalf. There are five inscriptions from statues dedicated to him while he was in this role. When Ptolemy X proclaimed himself king on Cyprus in 114 BC, Helenus was officially appointed governor once more.

When Ptolemy X went to Alexandria in 107 BC to replace his brother as the co-ruler of his mother Cleopatra III, Helenus accompanied him and was appointed admiral (nauarchos) of the fleet. As a reward for his services, Cleopatra III appointed him as the first priest of the newly established cult of herself as the 'Beneficent and Mother-loving Goddess' (Euergetis kai Philometor Thea). But the next year, he was replaced in this role by Theodorus, his predecessor as governor of Cyprus.

It is unlikely that Helenus died in 106 BC. In that year, Cleopatra III and Ptolemy X had clashed and Cleopatra assumed sole rule in Alexandria. As a close associate of her son, Helenus would not have been suitable in the role of the queen's priest, so she probably had him replaced.

== Bibliography ==
- Willy Peremans, Edmond Van‘t Dack, Leon Mooren, W. Swinnen: "Prosopographia Ptolemaica VI: La cour, les relations internationales et les possessions extérieures, la vie culturelle (Nos 14479-17250)." Studia Hellenistica. 21 (1968), no. 15041.
- Terence B. Mitford: "Helenos, Governor of Cyprus." The Journal of Hellenic Studies. 79 (1959), pp. 94–131.
- Terence B. Mitford: "The Hellenistic Inscriptions of Old Paphos" The Annual of the British School at Athens. 56 (1961), pp. 1–41.
- Ludwig Koenen: "Kleopatra III. als Priesterin des Alexanderkultes (P. Colon. inv. nr. 5063)," Zeitschrift für Papyrologie und Epigraphik. 5 (1970), pp. 61–84.
- Edmond van’t Dack: "Apollodôros et Helenos" Sacris erudiri. 31 (1989/90), pp. 429–441.

Preceded by Theodorus, son of Seleucus	Ptolemaic governor of Cyprus; 118–116 BC; 114–107 BC	Succeeded by Ptolemy IX
Preceded by Ptolemy X	Ptolemaic governor of Cyprus; 118–116 BC; 114–107 BC	Succeeded by ?
