= Ptolemy, son of Agesarchos =

Governor of Cyprus

Ptolemy (Ancient Greek: Πτολεμαῖος), son of Agesarchus (Ἀγήσαρχος), was a governor of Cyprus for the Hellenistic Ptolemaic Kingdom.

In 204 BC, Ptolemy was sent to Rome as an ambassador. Between 197 and 180 BC Ptolemy was governor of Cyprus, after having inherited the office by Polykrates of Argos. His daughter was Eirene of Alexandria, who went on to become a Panathenaian victor, and a priestess for the Ptolemaic queen.
