= Caudus =

Town in ancient Crete

Coordinates: 34°52′05″N 24°04′44″E

Caudus or Kaudos (Ancient Greek: Καῦδος) was the principal town of Gavdos off ancient Crete. The execution of Sotades by Patroclus, according to some interpretations, took place at or near the town.

Suda writes that it was famous for its large onagers.

Its site is tentatively located near modern Ag. Ioannis.
