= Crocus (general) =

Ptolemaic governor of Cyprus and admiral of the Ptolemaic navy

Crocus (Ancient Greek: Κρόκος) was Ptolemaic governor of Cyprus and admiral of the Ptolemaic navy in the second century BC.

Crocus is mentioned as governor (strategos) of Cyprus and admiral (nauarchos) in three inscriptions dated between 131 and 124 BC. His predecessor in this role was Seleucus, son of Bithys. During Crocus's tenure as governor there was a civil war between Cleopatra II and Ptolemy VIII, who made Cyprus his power-base. In one inscription, Crocus's title is given as strategos autokrator, which indicates that he held unlimited authority, analogous to a viceroy. Ptolemy VIII probably gave him this extra power so that he could concentrate on fighting the civil war.

After the end of the civil war, Crocus is attested in one more inscription, no longer in the role of governor, but as a close associate of the king (hypermachos), whom he probably accompanied back to Alexandria. His successor in Cyprus was Theodorus, the son of his predecessor.

== Bibliography ==
- Roger S. Bagnall: The Administration of the Ptolemaic possessions outside Egypt. (1976), p. 259.
- Wilhelm Dittenberger: Orientis Graeci inscriptiones selectae, Vol. 1 (1903), No. 140, p. 221.
- T. B. Mitford: "Seleucus and Theodorus," Opuscula Atheniensia, Vol. 1 (1953), pp. 130–171.
- T. B. Mitford: "The Hellenistic Inscriptions of Old Paphos," The Annual of the British School at Athens, Vol. 56 (1961), p. 28.

Preceded by Seleucus, son of Bithys	Ptolemaic governor of Cyprus; 131–124 BC	Succeeded by Theodorus, son of Seleucus
