= Pelops, son of Pelops =

Pelops (Ancient Greek: Πέλοψ) was an official in the third century Ptolemaic Kingdom, son of Pelops, son of Alexander, who had himself been a Ptolemaic official.

Under King Ptolemy III, Pelops held an official position in Cyrene – he was probably the governor (Libyarches). From 217 BC, he served Ptolemy IV as governor (strategos) of Cyprus, as known from three inscriptions found on the island. He is the earliest Ptolemaic governor to be attested epigraphically. He was still in post shortly after the birth of Ptolemy V on 9 October 209 BC. He probably remained in charge of the island until spring 203 BC, when Ptolemy IV died and Queen Arsinoe III was murdered by Sosibius and Agathocles, who then took over the regency for the young king. Pelops had been openly opposed to Sosibius and Agathocles, so he was appointed ambassador to the Seleucid king Antiochus III by Agathocles to keep him away from the Ptolemaic court in Alexandria. He is not attested again after this. Polycrates of Argos replaced him as governor of Cyprus.

Pelops was married to Myrsine, daughter of Hyperbassas, who was honoured with a statue in the temple of Aphrodite in Paphos on account of her husband's service to the father-loving gods (Ptolemy IV and Arsinoe III). Her sister Iamneia held the priestly role of 'basket-bearer' (canephorus) of Arsinoe II in 243/242 BC and athlophorus of Berenice II in 196/195 BC. Pelops and Myrsine had a son called Ptolemy.

== Bibliography ==
- Terence Bruce Mitford: "Ptolemy Son of Pelops." The Journal of Egyptian Archaeology. (JEA) 46 (1960) pp. 109–111.

| Preceded by ? | Ptolemaic Governor of Cyprus; 217–203 BC | Succeeded by Polycrates of Argos |
