= Battle of Ephesus (ca. 258 BC) =

Between the Rhodian and Ptolemaic fleets

The Battle of Ephesus was a naval battle off the coast of Asia Minor near Ephesus in which the Rhodian fleet, commanded by Agathostratus, defeated a Ptolemaic fleet under the Athenian admiral Chremonides. The battle is only briefly mentioned by Polyaenus in his book on stratagems. Like its near contemporaries, the battles at Cos and Andros, its date is heavily disputed due to meager evidence, with most scholars placing it in c. 259/8 BC or at any rate during the Second Syrian War (260–253 BC), while others have preferred the Third Syrian War (246–241 BC) and have proposed dates from 245/4 BC to 242 BC. This, however, is incompatible with more recently discovered sources, and modern research places the battle within a timeframe from c. 261 BC to c. 246 BC. It is also possible that the battle was not part of a wider imperial conflict between the great Hellenistic powers, but a confrontation between Rhodes and Ptolemaic Egypt alone. Along with Cos and Andros, Ephesus was instrumental in breaking Ptolemaic sea power in the Aegean Sea and replacing it with Macedonian and Rhodian predominance.

== Sources ==
- Berthold, Richard M. (2009). Rhodes in the Hellenistic Age. Ithaca and London: Cornell University Press. pp. 81–101. ISBN 978-0-8014-7597-9.
- Huss, Werner (2001). Ägypten in hellenistischer Zeit 332-30 v. Chr (in German). Munich: C.H. Beck. pp. 283–285. ISBN 3-406-47154-4.
- Seibert, Jakob (1976). "Die Schlacht Bei Ephesos". Historia (in German). 25 (1): 45–61. ISSN 0018-2311. JSTOR 4435485.
