= Dioscurides (nephew of Antigonus I) =

4th century Macedonian officer, admiral for Antigonus Monophthalmus

Dioscurides or Dioskourides (Greek: Διοσκουρίδης, fl. 314–313 BC) was a nephew of Antigonus I Monophthalmus and admiral during the Wars of the Diadochi.

Little is known about him. He might have been a brother of Polemaios, another nephew of Antigonus. Dioscurides is first mentioned in the history of Diodorus of Sicily, in 314 BC, when he led 80 ships from the Hellespont and Rhodes to assist Antigonus during his siege of Tyre. This might indicate that he had been put in charge of raising ships in these areas by his uncle . Antigonus then sent him with a fleet of 190 ships to the Aegean Sea, with the task of getting the local islands to switch their support to Antigonus. He was apparently successful in this mission, and this event is generally considered by modern scholars to mark the establishment of the Nesiotic League.

In late 313 BC, Dioscurides led an Antigonid fleet in the defence of Lemnos from the Athenians, who had been encouraged to attack the island by Antigonus' rival, Cassander. Nothing further is known of him thereafter. According to Antigonus' biographer Richard Billows, this may be because Dioscurides died young, or because he later participated in Polemaios' unsuccessful rebellion against Antigonus.

== Sources ==
- Billows, Richard A. (1990). Antigonos the One-Eyed and the Creation of the Hellenistic State. Berkeley and Los Angeles, California: University of California Press. ISBN 0-520-20880-3.
