= Chremonides =

Athenian statesman and general

- Χρεμωνίδης
- Born: 3rd century BC; Athens
- Occupations: Statesman, General
- Known for: Issuing the Decree of Chremonides, Chremonidean War

Chremonides (Ancient Greek: Χρεμωνίδης), son of Eteokles of Aithalidai, was an Athenian 3rd century BC statesman and general. He issued the Decree of Chremonides in 268 BC, creating an alliance between Sparta, Athens, and Ptolemy II, the Macedonian King of Egypt. This was a defensive alliance against King Antigonus of Macedon which led to the Chremonidean War.

Chremonides and his brother, Glaucon, were compelled to flee Athens and take refuge in Egypt. There, Chremonides became an admiral of the Egyptian fleet and led it during the Battle of Ephesus in c. 258 BC, while his brother became a priest.

Apart from being a capable politician and general, Chremonides was also a Stoic philosopher, belonging to the philosophical school of Zeno and his followers.
