= Philocles, King of Sidon =

King of Sidon

Philocles (Greek: Φιλοκλής, romanized: Philokles) was King of Sidon and a military commander under the Ptolemaic dynasty in the late 4th and early 3rd century BC, and one of the architects of Ptolemaic imperialism in the coasts of Asia Minor and the Aegean Sea. He served as an admiral in the Ptolemaic navy during the Second Syrian War.

His life is known only through inscriptions and a single literary passage. Philocles' origin and early life are therefore unknown. The name of his father, Apollodorus, survives, but it is likely that despite the Greek names used in the Greek sources, both were Phoenicians, and most likely descendants or relatives of the royal line of Sidon.

The date and circumstances of his acquiring of the royal title are unknown; after his capture of Sidon in 332 BC Alexander the Great installed one Abdalonymos as king, but nothing further is known of him. Philocles is first securely attested as "King of the Sidonians" in an Athenian inscription of 286/5 BC. Philocles however first appears much earlier, in a list of benefactors who donated money to rebuild the city of Thebes, which had been razed by Alexander. He is recorded twice in the list, as having donated the huge sum of 100 talents and as having donated an unspecified sum in Alexandrian talents. As the name is partially erased, it is unclear what title, if any, Philocles bore at the time. Since the list dates to the last decades of the 4th century—the reconstruction of Thebes was decreed by Cassander in 316 BC—and Sidon was under the control of Antigonus I Monophthalmus at the time, it has been suggested that Philocles was in Antigonid service originally, but his later career as a high-ranking and evidently trusted Ptolemaic official seems to argue against this. As Sidon itself did not come under the control of Ptolemy I Soter until 287 BC, therefore, Philocles either laid claim on the royal title as a claimant in exile, or he was originally simply a private citizen and a trusted agent of Ptolemy, and was only later elevated to the kingship. His donation of such a large amount of money to Thebes would then have to be considered as part of his role as a Ptolemaic agent, trying to curry favour with the Greek city-states.

In his collection of stratagems, the 2nd-century author Polyaenus records that "Philocles, general of Ptolemy" took the city of Kaunos by treachery. It is likely that this Philocles is identical to the "King of the Sidonians", but the date is unclear: Kaunos was first captured by Ptolemy in 309 BC—thus confirming that Philocles was in Ptolemaic, rather than Antigonid, service at the time—but it then reverted to Antigonid rule until sometime after c. 286 BC, which coincides with the Athenian inscription mentioning him. A decree from Aspendos honouring mercenaries who, under Philocles and the Ptolemaic general Leonidas, saved the city from an unspecified attack, has variously been dated between 306 BC and 287 BC. Given that Leonidas is otherwise attested mostly for the period 310–306 BC, an earlier date in that range seems the more likely, indicating again that Philocles was never in Antigonid service.

In the late 280s, Philocles is attested in a series of inscriptions from various Greek islands, which show him intervening in various disputes and issues of governance in the city-states under Ptolemaic control. His title is unspecified, but he was clearly senior to the nesiarchos of the Nesiotic League, and probably the overall commander of the Ptolemaic forces in the Aegean, perhaps with the title of nauarchos. The last inscriptions concerning him date to c. 280/279 BC, indicating that this was the end of his career in the region. According to Hans Hauben, this activity means that Philocles "should probably be considered the main architect, or at least one of the main architects, of early Ptolemaic expansion in the Mediterranean".

== Sources ==
- Hauben, Hans (2013). "Callicrates of Samos and Patroclus of Macedon, champions of Ptolemaic thalassocracy". In Buraselis, Kostas; Stefanou, Mary; Thompson, Dorothy J. (eds.). The Ptolemies, the Sea and the Nile: Studies in Waterborne Power. Cambridge University Press. pp. 39–65. ISBN 9781107033351.
- Merker, Irwin L. (1970). "The Ptolemaic Officials and the League of the Islanders". Historia: Zeitschrift für Alte Geschichte. 19 (2): 141–160. ISSN 0018-2311. JSTOR 4435128.
- Seibert, Jakob (1970). "Philokles, Sohn des Apollodoros, König der Sidonier". Historia: Zeitschrift für Alte Geschichte (in German). 19 (3): 337–351. ISSN 0018-2311. JSTOR 4435141.
