= Richard Berthold =

American historian of ancient Greece (born 1946)

Richard Martin Berthold (born 1946) is an American classical historian, an associate professor emeritus at the University of New Mexico. He is the author of two books on classical history and is also known for his opinions on politics and religion.

== Books ==
Berthold is the author of the book Rhodes in the Hellenistic Age (Cornell University Press, 1984) and of the self-published Dare to Struggle: The History and Society of Greece (2009).

== Education and career ==
Berthold graduated from Stanford University in 1967. He did his graduate studies at Cornell University, earning a M.A. in 1969 with the thesis The Battle at Marathon and completing his Ph.D. in 1971 with the dissertation Rhodian Foreign Affairs 205-164 B.C.. After a year as a part-time lecturer at Cornell, he joined the faculty of the University of New Mexico in 1972 as an assistant professor. In 1999 he was awarded the university's highest teaching award and celebrated by the university president as the institution's gadfly. He retired from the University of New Mexico in 2002, and though he was invited in 2006 to teach a seminar for the university's honors program, the university administration refused to allow it.

== Controversies ==
On the day of September 11, 2001 terrorist attacks Berthold quipped to his Western Civilization and Greek History classes that "Anybody who blows up the Pentagon gets my vote." After a university investigation, Berthold received an official reprimand, signed a confession, and was removed from the freshman Western Civ course he had been teaching for thirty years. The semester after the official reprimand and teaching sanctions took effect, Berthold took early retirement when the History Department suddenly denied him the graduate Teaching Assistants traditionally associated with large classes.

In 2005 he was barred from a local religious conference center after presenting archaeological research contradicting the biblical story of the Exodus. He drew renewed media attention in 2018 for using Nazi insignia to protest the policies of the Republican Party.
