= Pelops, son of Alexander =

Pelops (Ancient Greek: Πέλοψ), son of Alexander, was an official in Ptolemaic Egypt in the third century BC.

Pelops came from Macedonia and became a 'Friend' (philos) of King Ptolemy II, serving him as a military commander on Samos. In 281 BC, he was honoured with Samian citizenship. In the twenty-second year of Ptolemy II (264/3 BC), Pelops served as Priest of Alexander.

Pelops had a younger brother, Taurinus, who himself served as Priest of Alexander in 260/59. Pelops' son, also called Pelops, was also a Ptolemaic official.

== Bibliography ==
- T. B. Mitford: "Ptolemy Son of Pelops." The Journal of Egyptian Archaeology. (JEA) 46 (1960) pp. 109–111.
