= Aulic titulature =

System of titles for court protocol

Aulic titulature is a term, derived from the Greek aulè and Latin aula (in the meaning palace), for hierarchic systems of titles specifically in use for court protocol. Aulic titulature is the name for a system of official rank titles, conferred – ex officio or nominatim – to actual courtiers and as an honorary rank (for protocol) to various military and civilian officials. The term is most often used with reference to the Hellenistic kingdoms, particularly Ptolemaic Egypt.

== Hellenistic kingdoms ==
In Ptolemaic Egypt, diadochos (διάδοχος, "substitute") was the lowest aulic rank, under philos [basilikos] (φίλος [βασιλικός], "[royal] friend"), archisomatophylax (ἀρχισωματοφύλαξ, "arch-bodyguard"), protos philos (πρῶτος φίλος, "first friend"), homotimos (ὁμότιμος, "[nearly] equal dignitary") and syggeneus (συγγενεὺς, "cognate of the crown"), during the reign of Ptolemy V Epiphanes (204–181 BC). A similar system of titles was in place in other Hellenistic monarchies. In the Ptolemaic court, the aulic titulature is also distinguished from the titles awarded honoris causa since several are determined by aulic functions such as the chamberlain or the master of the hunt.

=== Dynamics and motivation ===
Scholars describe the aulic titulature as a complex system, and stress that the meanings of many of the attested titles within it are unknown. One approach to understanding it is through the view that it is a form of formalised informality where a philos' power position, for instance, at court was indicated by his title and not necessarily fixed by it. While the hierarchisation in the court titulature and the status differentiation is seen as advantageous to the king, it is also believed to be an instrument for the top of the court society to close their ranks as they jockey for positions and privileges. It is commonly supposed that the institution of a system of court ranks and titles was intended to reinforce the bond between the monarch and his ministers by playing on the vanity of the courtiers. There are also accounts that show how the distribution of aulic titles served as a form of gift exchange and that the recipient was awarded gifts such as purple clothing, crowns, and horse trappings in order to show his rank or to derive his status from.
