= Ludwig Koenen =

German-American papyrologist (1931–2023)

Ludwig Koenen

Ludwig Koenen (April 5, 1931 – May 9, 2023) was a German-born American papyrologist and classical philologist. He spent most of his career as a professor at the University of Michigan, where he taught from 1975 to 2000. He eventually attained the named chair of Herbert C. Youtie Distinguished University Professor of Papyrology. He edited the publication of numerous papyri from the collections at the University of Cologne and the University of Michigan Papyrology Collection.

== Biography ==
Ludwig Koenen was born in Cologne, Germany in 1931. He studied classical philology at the University of Cologne, where he studied under Reinhold Merkelbach. Through Merkelbach, he was introduced to papyrology (the study of ancient papyri, a writing medium preserving classical literature) and the considerable papyrus collection of the University of Cologne. He finished his thesis in 1956, Eine ptolemäische Königsurkunde (P. Kroll), published the following year. Koenen received his PhD in 1957 and became an archivist managing the Cologne Papyrus Collection. As a post-graduate, he gave courses on papyrology, epigraphy, and paleography.

In 1967 he and Merkelbach founded Zeitschrift für Papyrologie und Epigraphik, the most important journal in papyrology and ancient Mediterranean epigraphy, where he served as an editor. After research stays in Oxford and London, Koenen completed his habilitation in 1969 at the University of Cologne. In 1971, he became a professor at the University of Cologne. In 1975, he moved to Ann Arbor to the University of Michigan as an associate professor; the University of Michigan Papyrology Collection is one of the largest in the world. In addition to his papyrological work, he also taught classes on the Ancient Greek language, Ancient Greek poetry and literature, and the Ancient Greek religion. In 1989, he was appointed Herbert C. Youtie Professor of Papyrology, and in 1995 was promoted to Distinguished Professor. In 1996 he was honored with the Henry Russel Lectureship. He took emeritus status at Michigan in 2000.

Koenen was internationally recognized as a leading papyrologist of his era. He was a member of the Association Internationale de Papyrologues and its president from 1995 to 2001, and honorary president from 2004. He was a member of the American Philosophical Society (from 1991) and the American Academy of Arts and Sciences (from 1993). In 1993–1994 he was president of the American Philological Association. From 1985, he was a corresponding member of the German Archaeological Institute, and from 1998 a corresponding member of the North Rhine-Westphalian Academy of Sciences. He was a Corresponding (non-British) Fellow of the British Academy.

Koenen's most significant work may have been his research and publications on the Cologne Mani-Codex, a document containing more information on Manichaeism and the obscure Elchasaites, a Jewish Christian sect in Babylonia. A festschrift honoring Koenen was published in 1996, Michigan texts published in honor of Ludwig Koenen.

In his personal life, he married Margret Bolder. The couple had three sons and a daughter together, including the Old Testament scholar Klaus Koenen.

Koenen died on May 9, 2023.

== Selected works ==
- Eine ptolemäische Königsurkunde (P. Kroll) (Klassisch-philologische Studien 19). Harrassowitz, Wiesbaden 1957. (Dissertation, 1956)
- Eine agonistische Inschrift aus Ägypten und frühptolemäische Königsfeste (Beiträge zur klassischen Philologie 56). Hain, Meisenheim am Glan 1977, ISBN 3-445-01255-5.
- The Cairo Codex of Menander (P. Cair. J. 43227). University of London, Institute of Classical Studies, London 1978.
- with Albert Henrichs: Der Kölner Mani-Kodex. Abbildungen und diplomatischer Text (Papyrologische Texte und Abhandlungen 35). Habelt, Bonn 1985, ISBN 3-7749-2146-6.
- with Cornelia Römer: Der Kölner Mani-Kodex. Über das Werden seines Leibes. Kritische Edition (Abhandlungen der Rheinisch-Westfälischen Akademie der Wissenschaften. Sonderreihe Papyrologica Coloniensia 14). Westdeutscher Verlag, Opladen 1988, ISBN 3-531-09924-8.
- with Cornelia Römer: Mani. Auf der Spur einer verschollenen Religion. Herder, Freiburg 1993, ISBN 3-451-23090-9
- with Jaakko Frösén, Antti Arjava and Marjo Lehtinen: The Petra Papyri, Volume 2 (American Center of Oriental Research publications 7). American Center of Oriental Research, Amman 2013, ISBN 978-9957-8543-6-2.
