= Theodorus, son of Seleucus =

Ptolemaic governor of Cyprus and admiral in the second century BC

Theodoros (Ancient Greek: Θεόδωρος), son of Seleucus and Artemo I was a Ptolemaic governor of Cyprus and admiral in the second century BC.

== Life ==
Theodorus was named after his maternal grandfather. His mother served in the priestly role of kanephoros ('basket-bearer') of the deified Arsinoe II in Alexandria in 177/176 BC. He was born before 143 BC, since he dedicated a statue of the officers of the Ptolemaic garrison on Cyprus in that year. From 142 to 131 BC, Theodorus commanded the garrison at Salamis. His father served as governor of the island at that time and was succeeded by Crocus (131–124 BC).

After the end of the Ptolemaic civil war in 124 BC, Theodorus was appointed governor (strategos) of Cyprus and admiral (nauarchos). He is named in these roles repeatedly in the dedicatory inscriptions of many statues set up on Cyprus between 124 and 118 BC by Cypriot dignitaries and Ptolemaic military officials. In the first inscription, Theodorus is referred to with the expansive title of strategos autokrator, which suggests the extraordinary military responsibilities of the role, which he received from his predecessor Crocus, as a result of the civil war between Ptolemy VIII and Cleopatra II. In all other inscriptions, the qualification autokrator is absent, since this military power was withdrawn from the role by Ptolemy VIII after the end of the civil war.

In older scholarship, it was claimed that Theodorus died in 118 BC, but then his name was found in a papyrus document dated to 105/104 BC, in which he is named as priest of the "beneficent and mother-loving goddess" (Cleopatra III) for life and as leader of the council of Alexandria (exegetes). In this priestly role he was succeeded by Helenus of Cyrene, who was also his successor as governor of Cyprus.

== Family ==
Theodorus was married to his niece Olympias and had a son and three daughters with her, all of whom held priesthoods:

- Demetrius, priest of Cleopatra III (hieros polos ='sacred foal') in 107/106 and 105/104 BC.
- Polycratia, priestess (athlophoros) in 116/115 and 107/106 BC.
- Artemo III/Ariadne, priestess (stephanephoros ='crown bearer') in 116/115 BC.
- Theodoris, priestess (phōsphoros='light bearer') of Cleopatra III.

== Bibliography ==
- Roger S. Bagnall: The Administration of the Ptolemaic possessions outside Egypt, In: Columbia Studies in the Classical Tradition, Vol. 4 (1976), pp. 259–260.
- Willy Clarysse, E. van 't Dack: "Prosopographia Ptolemaica III: Le clergé, le notariat, les tribunaux, no. 4984-8040" (PP III) Studia Hellenstica. 11 (1956).
- Willy Clarysse: "Prosopographia Ptolemaica IX: Addenda et Corrigenda au volume III." (PP III/IX) Studia Hellenistica. 25 (1981).
- L. Koenen: "Kleopatra III. als Priesterin des Alexanderkultes (P. Colon. inv. nr. 5063)," Zeitschrift für Papyrologie und Epigraphik 5 (1970) pp. 61–84.
- T. B. Mitford: "Seleucus and Theodorus," Opuscula Atheniensia, Vol. 1 (1953), pp. 130–171.
- T. B. Mitford: "The Hellenistic Inscriptions of Old Paphos." The Annual of the British School at Athens 56 (1961), pp. 1–41.

Preceded by Crocus	Ptolemaic governor of Cyprus; 124–118 BC	Succeeded by Helenus of Cyrene
