= Zeitschrift für Papyrologie und Epigraphik =

- Discipline: Classics
- Language: English

Publication details
- History: 1967–present
- Publisher: Rudolf Habelt GmbH

Standard abbreviations
- ISO 4: Z. Papyrol. Epigr.

Indexing
- ISSN: 0084-5388
- LCCN: 72291857
- JSTOR: zeitpapyepig
- OCLC no.: 01466587

Links
- Journal homepage

The Zeitschrift für Papyrologie und Epigraphik (commonly abbreviated ZPE; "Journal of Papyrology and Epigraphy") is a peer-reviewed academic journal which contains articles that pertain to papyrology and epigraphy. It has been described as "the world's leading and certainly most prolific journal of papyrology." ZPE, established by Reinhold Merkelbech and Ludwig Koenen in 1967, is published four to five times annually by Rudolf Habelt GmbH. It is renowned for its ability to publish new articles very quickly.

The current editors of ZPE are Werner Eck, Helmut Engelman, Jürgen Hammerstaedt, Rudolf Kassel, Ludwig Koenen, Wolfgang Dieter Lebek, Klaus Maresch, Georg Petzl, and Cornelia Römer.
