= Polycrates of Argos =

Polycrates of Argos (Ancient Greek: Πολυκράτης), son of Mnasiades, was a Ptolemaic commander at the Battle of Raphia, as well as a governor of Cyprus and chancellor of the Ptolemaic Kingdom in the late third and early second centuries BC.

Descended from an illustrious family from Argos, Polycrates joined the court of the Egyptian monarch Ptolemy IV Philopator, just before his campaign against Antiochus III in 217 BC. He was of great service in drilling and encouraging the Egyptian troops, and he commanded the cavalry on the left wing at the Battle of Raphia, in which Antiochus was defeated, and which secured for Ptolemy the provinces of Coele-Syria, Phoenicia, and Palestine.

According to Polybius, although Polycrates was still young, he was second to no one in the king's court, and was accordingly appointed governor of Cyprus by Ptolemy. He discharged the duties of this office with the utmost fidelity and integrity. He secured the island for Ptolemy V Epiphanes, the infant son and successor of Ptolemy IV and, on his return to Alexandria around 196 BC, he brought with him a considerable sum of money for the King's use. He was received at Alexandria with great applause which made him a powerful influence in the kingdom.

But as he aged, it is said that his character changed for the worse, and he indulged in every kind of vice and wickedness. Because of the loss of the later books of Polybius, Polycrates's subsequent career is unknown. He seems to have taken part in the suppression of rebels in Egypt, wherein four rebel leaders named Athinis, Pausiras, Chesufus and Irobastus were brought in for negotiations, but were instead executed publicly and humiliatingly by Ptolemy. Polybius also recounts a story where mercenaries were presented to Ptolemy at Naucratis, but Ptolemy merely took them to Alexandria rather than to participate in an ongoing war, and this was somehow Polycrates's fault (perhaps due to bad advice?).

Polycrates was married to Zeuxo of Cyrene and had three daughters: Zeuxo, Eucrateia and Hermione.

Following his father's example as an athlete, Polycrates was a winner of the horse races at the Panathenaic Games from 192 to 184 BC, as were his wife and daughters. At that time, it was rare for women to participate in these races. For this reason they are frequently mentioned in texts from the Hellenistic period.
