= Battle of Cos =

Ancient naval battle

Coordinates: 36.8500°N 27.2333°E

- Part of the Chremonidean War or the Syrian Wars
Date	261/255 BC
Location	Kos
Result	Macedonian victory

Belligerents
Antigonid Macedonia	Ptolemaic Egypt

Commanders and leaders
Antigonus II Gonatas	Patroclus (?), admiral of Ptolemy II

The Battle of Cos was fought in c. 261 BC, or as late as 255 BC, between an Antigonid fleet and a Ptolemaic fleet. Antigonus II Gonatas led his forces to victory, possibly over Patroclus, admiral of Ptolemy II. It has been widely assumed that the battle severely damaged Ptolemaic control of the Aegean, but this has been contested After the battle, Antigonus dedicated his flagship to Apollo.

The date of the battle is uncertain, although it must fall within the period 262–256 BC. Hammond dates it as late as 255 BC, but it is now increasingly placed in 261 BC.

The Battle of Cos is proposed by modern scholars as one of three possible naval battles—along with the Battle of Amorgos (322 BC) and the Battle of Salamis (306 BC)—that provided the occasion for the erection of the statue of the Nike of Samothrace.
