= Chremonidean War =

War fought by some Greek city-states and Ptolemaic Egypt against Antigonid Macedonian

Date	267–261 BC
Location	Greece
Result	Macedonian victory

Belligerents
Macedonia	Athens; Sparta; Ptolemaic Kingdom

Commanders and leaders
Antigonus II Gonatas	Chremonides; Areus I †; Ptolemy II Philadelphus; Patroclus

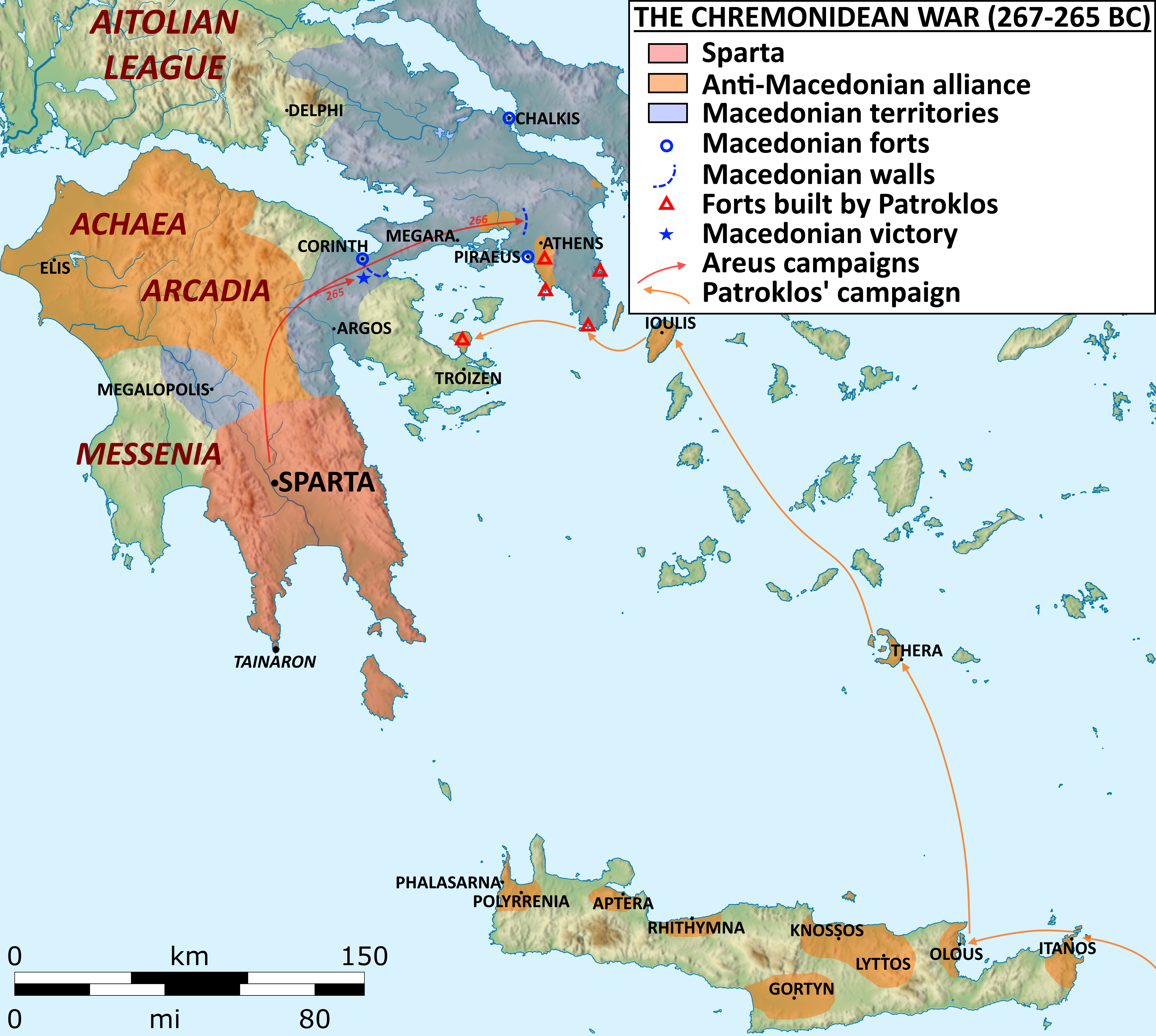
First stage of the Chremonidean War (267-265 BC), with the campaigns of the Spartan king Areus and the Ptolemaic admiral Patroclus.

The Chremonidean War (Ancient Greek: Χρεμωνίδειος Πόλεμος) (267–261 BC) was fought by a coalition of Greek city-states and Ptolemaic Egypt against Antigonid Macedonia. It ended in a Macedonian victory that confirmed Antigonid control over Greece. The conflict is considered a seminal event in the history of Greece during the Hellenistic period, as it was the last credible effort by the Greek city-states to re-establish their independence.

The Chremonidean War is poorly documented and known mostly through fragmentary accounts by later historians Pausanias and Justin. Athens and Sparta sought a restoration of their former independence, while the ambitions of Ptolemy II Philadelphus, pharaoh of Ptolemaic Egypt, in the Aegean were threatened by Antigonus Gonatas's fleet, so he built an anti-Macedonian coalition among the Greek city-states. He courted Athens by supplying the city with grain.

The anti-Macedonian faction in Athens, led by the Stoic statesman and general Chremonides, took power and declared war on Macedon (possibly as early as the autumn of 268 BC). The first year of the conflict saw only minor confrontations which generally ended favourably for the anti-Macedonian coalition. After the indecisive campaign season of 266 BC, in which Athens was assisted by a Ptolemaic fleet under Patroclus, the war began to turn against the Greek city-states, and in 265 BC Antigonus won a decisive and crushing victory outside Corinth during which Spartan King Areus I was killed.

With their primary ally defeated and too militarily weak to confront the Antigonids alone, the Athenians waited behind their walls, hoping the Ptolemies could send aid before the inevitable siege. Philadelphus could not mount a major expedition until after Athens had already been starved into surrender in either 262 BC or 261 BC. In the end, it did not matter since when the Ptolemies finally tried to send aid and reinforcements to Athens, their fleet was defeated off Cos (probably in 261 BC). This action, called the Battle of Cos, also features in the narrative of the second of the Syrian Wars with a strong alternative date of 258 or 255 BC.

After the end of the war, Athens lost her last pre-Hellenistic vestiges of political independence.
