= Adrien Prévost de Longpérier =

French numismatist, archaeologist and curator

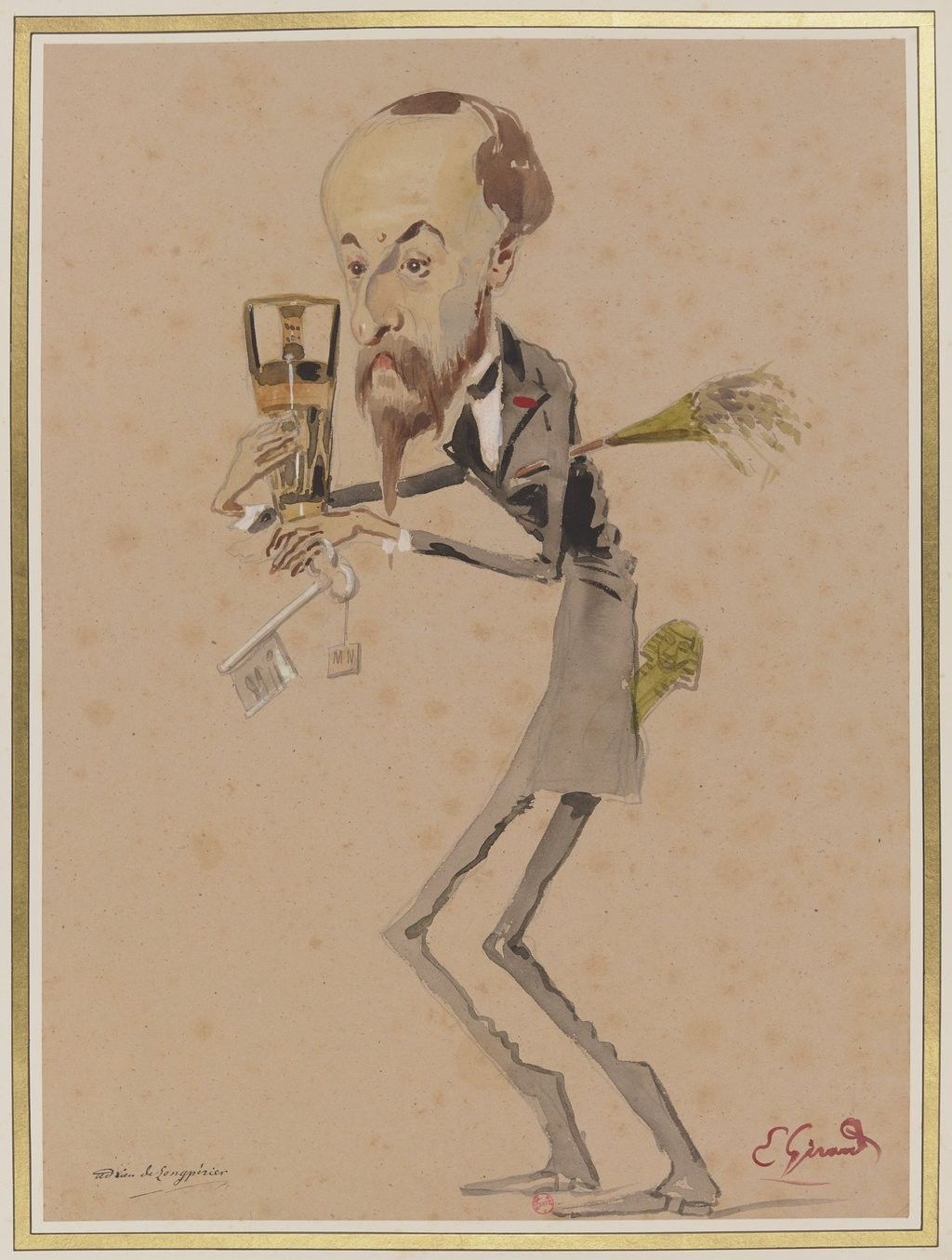
Caricature by Eugène Giraud

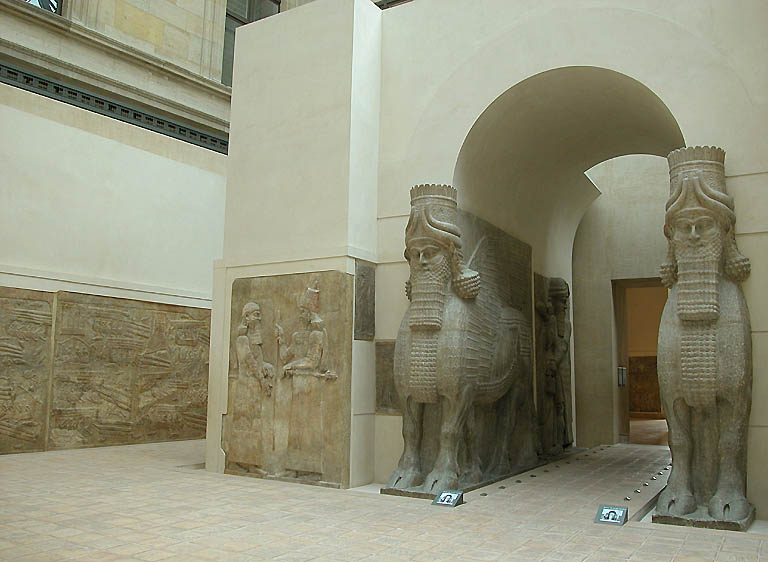
Sculptures of Khorsabad in their current presentation at the Louvre

Henry Adrien Prévost de Longpérier (21 September 1816, Paris – 14 January 1882) was a 19th-century French numismatist, archaeologist and curator.

== Biography ==
Adrien was the son of Henry Simon Prevost Longpérier, a commander of the National Guard who was later mayor of Meaux from 1840 to 1848.

In 1836, he entered the cabinet des médailles of the Bibliothèque royale (futur Bibliothèque nationale). Protected by Raoul-Rochette, he obtained the position of first employee in 1842. In 1840 he published a fundamental study of numismatics of Sassanid sovereigns, and devoted several years later to numismatics of the Arsacids. With baron Jean de Witte, he founded the Bulletin archéologique de l’Athenaeum français. In 1856, after the departure of Louis de La Saussaye, Adrien de Longpérier took over the direction of the Revue numismatique with Jean de Witte .

From 1847 to 1870 he was curator of the antiquities department of the Louvre. In 1848 he was the only curator of the Louvre not to be dismissed when the regime changed. As curator of antiquities he was responsible for collections from cultural areas and of varied ages. As such, he welcomed in the Louvre the first Assyrian sculptures arrived in France since Khorsabad, and took a close interest in deciphering the cuneiform script. He was also responsible for receiving the Campana collection. His numerous scientific interests include civilizations of America and national antiquities: Longpérier was behind the creation of the Louvre's Musée mexicain (1850) and a member of the commission for the establishment of the National Archaeological Museum in Saint-Germain-en-Laye.

In 1854 he was elected a member of the Académie des Inscriptions et Belles-Lettres. He was editor of the Revue numismatique from 1856 to 1872. From 1858 he was a member of the Comité des travaux historiques et scientifiques.

In a eulogy read on 14 June 1882 at a meeting of the Société des Antiquaires de France, Longpérier's disciple Gustave Schlumberger said of him that he "had read everything, had complete mastery of all the written sources left to us by Antiquity" and that he knew "all the artefacts that have been found and have accumulated in the great museums and collections of Europe (...) Mr de Longpérier was the last universal archaeologist, having studied all forms of figuration from Antiquity, capable of addressing all the corresponding topics; now there are only specialists."

== Works ==
- 1840: Essai sur les médailles des rois perses de la dynastie Sassanide, F. Didot Frères, Paris, 88 pages.
- 1848: Notice des monnaies française composant la collection de M.J. Rousseau accompagnée d’indications historiques et géographiques et précédée de considérations sur la numismatique française, Paris.
- 1850: Notice des antiquités assyriennes, babyloniennes, perses, hébraïques Notice des monuments exposés dans la salle des antiquités américaines (Mexique et Pérou), au musée du Louvre.
- 1868: Notice des bronzes antiques exposés dans les galeries du Musée impérial du Louvre, 224 pages.
- 1868: Recherches sur les insignes de la questure et sur les récipients monétaires, Didier, 95 pages.
- Œuvres de Longpérier réunies et mises en ordre par G. Schlumberger (volume 1 : Archéologie orientale. Monuments arabes; volume 2 : Antiquités grecques, romaines et gauloises (1838–1861); volume 3 : Antiquités grecques, romaines et gauloises (1862–1883); volume 4. Moyen Âge et renaissance (1837–1858); volume 5 : Moyen Âge et renaissance (1858–1868); volume 6 : Moyen Âge et renaissance (1869–1883) Antiquités américaines. Supplément: Bibliographie générale; volume 7 : Nouveau supplément et Table générale.), Leroux, Paris, 1883–1886.
