= Mexican Museum =

Mexican Museum may refer to:

- Musée mexicain in Paris, hosted in the Louvre from 1850 to 1887
- Mexican Museum (San Francisco), opened in 1975
- National Museum of Mexican Art in Chicago, opened in 1982
- Mexic-Arte Museum in Austin, Texas, founded in 1983

== See also ==
- List of museums in Mexico
