= Charles D. Fredricks =

American photographer (1823–1894)

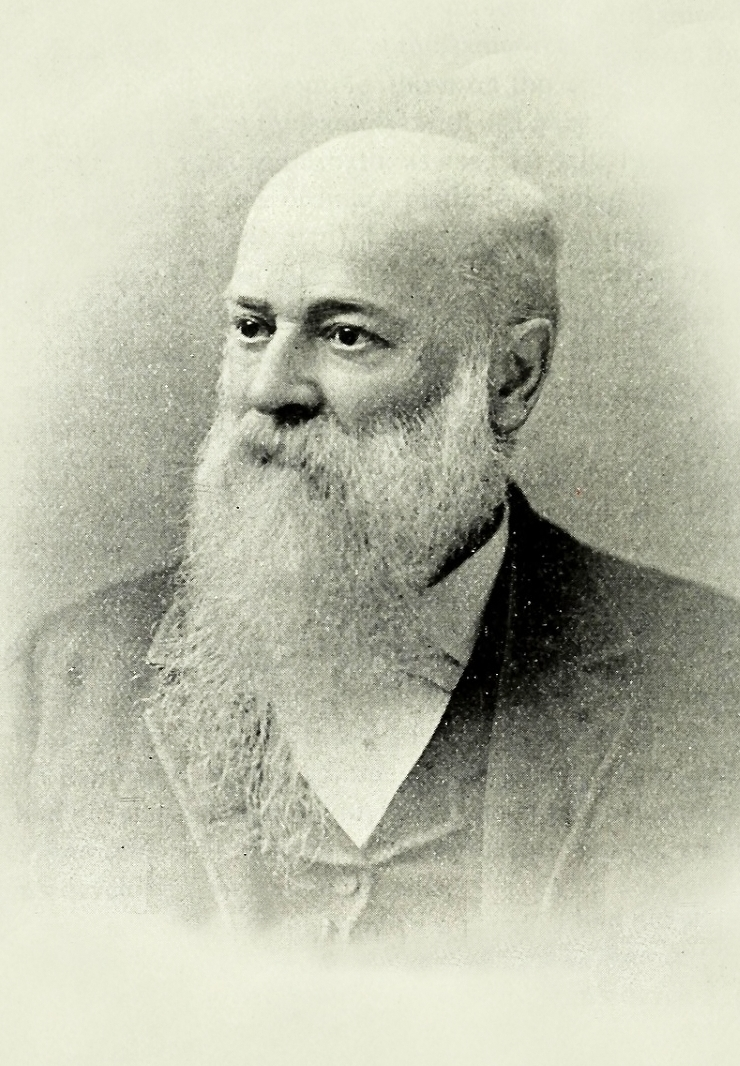
- Born: Charles DeForest Fredricks; December 11, 1823; New York, New York, US
- Died: May 25, 1894 (aged 70); Newark, New Jersey, US
- Occupation: Photographer
- Years active: 1843−1889

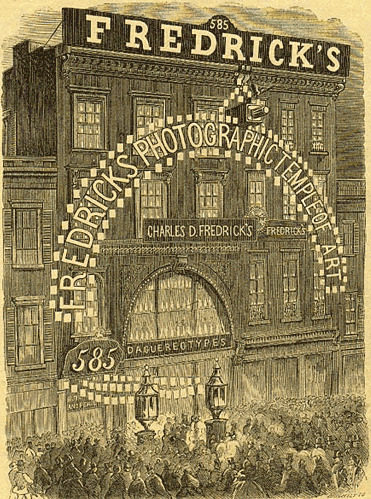
Fredricks' Photographic Temple of Art on Broadway, 1858

Charles DeForest Fredricks (December 11, 1823 – May 25, 1894) was an American photographer.

== Biography ==
Charles D. Fredricks was born in New York City on December 11, 1823. He learned the art of the daguerreotype from Jeremiah Gurney in New York, while he worked as a casemaker for Edward Anthony. In 1843, at the suggestion of his brother, Fredricks sailed for Angostura, today Ciudad Bolívar, Venezuela. His business took him to Pará, Rio Grande do Sul, Montevideo, Buenos Aires. He enjoyed great success in South America, remaining there until some time in the early 1850s.

Following a brief period in Charleston, South Carolina, Fredricks moved to Paris in 1853. Here he became the first photographer to create life-sized portraits, which artists (like Jules-Émile Saintin) were hired to color using pastel.

On his return to New York City, he rejoined Jeremiah Gurney, though it is not clear whether he was initially a partner or an employee. By 1854, he had developed an early process for enlarging photographs. His partnership with Gurney ended in 1855.

During the latter half of the decade he operated a studio in Havana. Here he received awards for his photographic oil colors and watercolors. During the 1860s he operated a studio on Broadway that was noted for its cartes de visites. In the early 1860s, Charles Fredricks personally photographed John Wilkes Booth (the assassin of President Lincoln) on several occasions at his studio.

He retired from photography in 1889 and died in Newark, New Jersey, five years later, on May 25, 1894.
