= François Lenormant =

French archaeologist and Assyriologist (1837–1883)

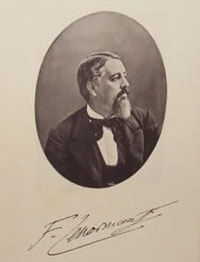
- Born: 17 January 1837; Paris, France
- Died: 9 December 1883 (aged 46); Paris, France
- Occupation: Archaeologist

François Lenormant (French: [lənɔʁmɑ̃]; 17 January 1837 – 9 December 1883) was a 19th-century French Hellenist, Assyriologist, and archaeologist.

== Biography ==
=== Early life ===
Lenormant's father, Charles Lenormant, distinguished as an archaeologist, numismatist and Egyptologist, was anxious that his son should follow in his steps. He made him begin Greek at the age of six, and the child responded so well to this precocious scheme of instruction, that when he was only fourteen an essay of his, on the Greek tablets found at Memphis, appeared in the Revue Archéologique. In 1856 he won the numismatic prize of the Académie des Inscriptions with an essay entitled Classification des monnaies des Lagides and in 1862 he became sub-librarian of the Institut de France.

In 1858 he visited Italy and in 1859 accompanied his father on a journey of exploration to Greece, during which Charles succumbed to fever at Athens. Lenormant returned to Greece three times during the next six years, supervising excavations at Eleusis and gave up all the time he could spare from his official work to archaeological research. He summarized his studies in a popular Manuel d'histoire ancienne de l'Orient jusqu'aux guerres Médiques (Paris 1868). These peaceful labors were rudely interrupted by the Franco-Prussian War, when Lenormant served with the army and was wounded in the Siege of Paris. In 1874 he was appointed professor of archaeology at the Bibliothèque Nationale de France, and in the following year he collaborated with the Baron Jean de Witte in founding the Gazette archéologique.

=== Accomplishments ===
As early as 1867 he had turned his attention to Assyrian studies; he was among the first to recognize in the cuneiform inscriptions the existence of a non-Semitic language he named Akkadian (today it is known as Sumerian). Lenormant's knowledge was of encyclopaedic extent, ranging over an immense number of subjects, and at the same time thorough, though somewhat lacking perhaps in the strict accuracy of the modern school. Most of his varied studies were directed towards tracing the origins of the two great civilizations of the ancient world, which were to be sought in Mesopotamia and on the shores of the Mediterranean. He had a perfect passion for exploration. Besides his early expeditions to Greece, he visited the south of Italy three times with this object, and it was while exploring in Calabria that he met with an accident which ended fatally in Paris after a long illness.

The amount and variety of Lenormant's work is truly amazing when it is remembered that he died at the early age of forty-six. By 1881 he'd been named as a member of the Académie des Inscriptions et Belles-Lettres. Probably the best known of his books are Les Origines de l'histoire d'après la Bible, and his ancient history of the East and account of Chaldean magic. He also contributed articles to the Dictionnaire des Antiquités Grecques et Romaines, though he did not live to see the dictionary's completion. For breadth of view, combined with extraordinary subtlety of intuition, he was probably unrivalled. He is immortalized in Greece with a main road in Athens named after him.

== Selected works ==
- "Sur l'origine chrétienne des inscriptions sinaïtiques" in Journal Asiatique, XIII (5th ser., Paris, 1859)
- Histoire des Massacres de Syrie en 1860 (Paris, 1861).
- La Révolution en Grèce (Paris, 1862)
- Essai sur l'organisation politique et économique de la monnaie dans l'antiquité (Paris, 1863)
- Turcs et Monténégrins (Paris, 1866)
- Comples Rendus de l'Académie des Sciences (vol. 65, p. 903, Paris, 1867)
- Chefs-d'œuvres de l'art antique (Paris. 1867-1868) in 7 vols.
- Histoire du peuple juif (Paris, 1869)
- Le déluge et l'épopée babylonnienne (Paris, 1873)
- Les premières civilisations (Paris, 1873. 2 vols.)
- La magie chez les chaldéens et les origines accadiennes (Paris, 1874)
- La langue primitive de Chaldée et les idiomes touraniens (Paris, 1875)
- La monnaie dans l'antiquité (Paris, 1878–1879)
- A travers l'Apulie et la Lucanie (Paris, 1883)
- La Genèse traduite d'après l'hébreu, avec distinction des éléments constitutifs du texte, suivi d‘un essai de restitution des textes dont s'est servi le dernier rédacteur (Paris, 1884)
