= Mastaba of Khafraankh =

Mastaba of Kafraankh
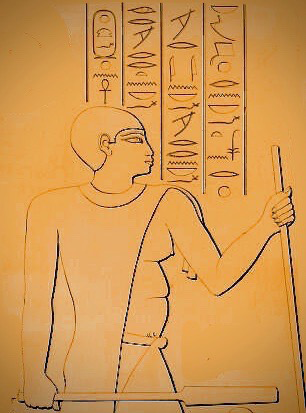
Khafraanch
wab s O24 w n < ra xa f > x anx n
Supervisor of wab-priests of the Pyramid "Great-is-Khafra"
Burial site of Khafraankh, Herenka, and Ishepet
- Interactive map of the Mastaba of Kafraankh area

General information
- Type: Mastaba
- Architectural style: Rock-cut Chapels
- Classification: type IV. (Reisner p.87,89, 162)
- Location: Giza, Egypt
- Coordinates: 29.9774667°N 31.1385833°E
- Years built: c. 2350 BC

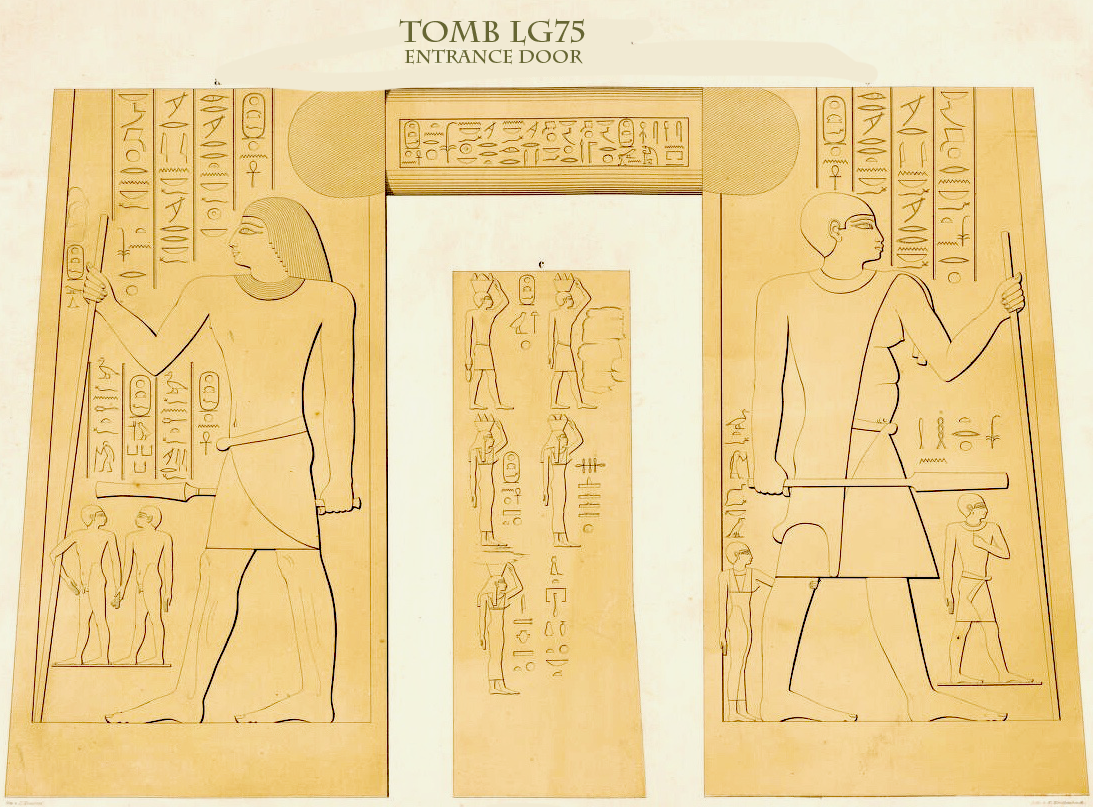
Entrance door, on both sides Khafraanch, figures of sons and daughters; on the architrave is a list Khafraanch's titles

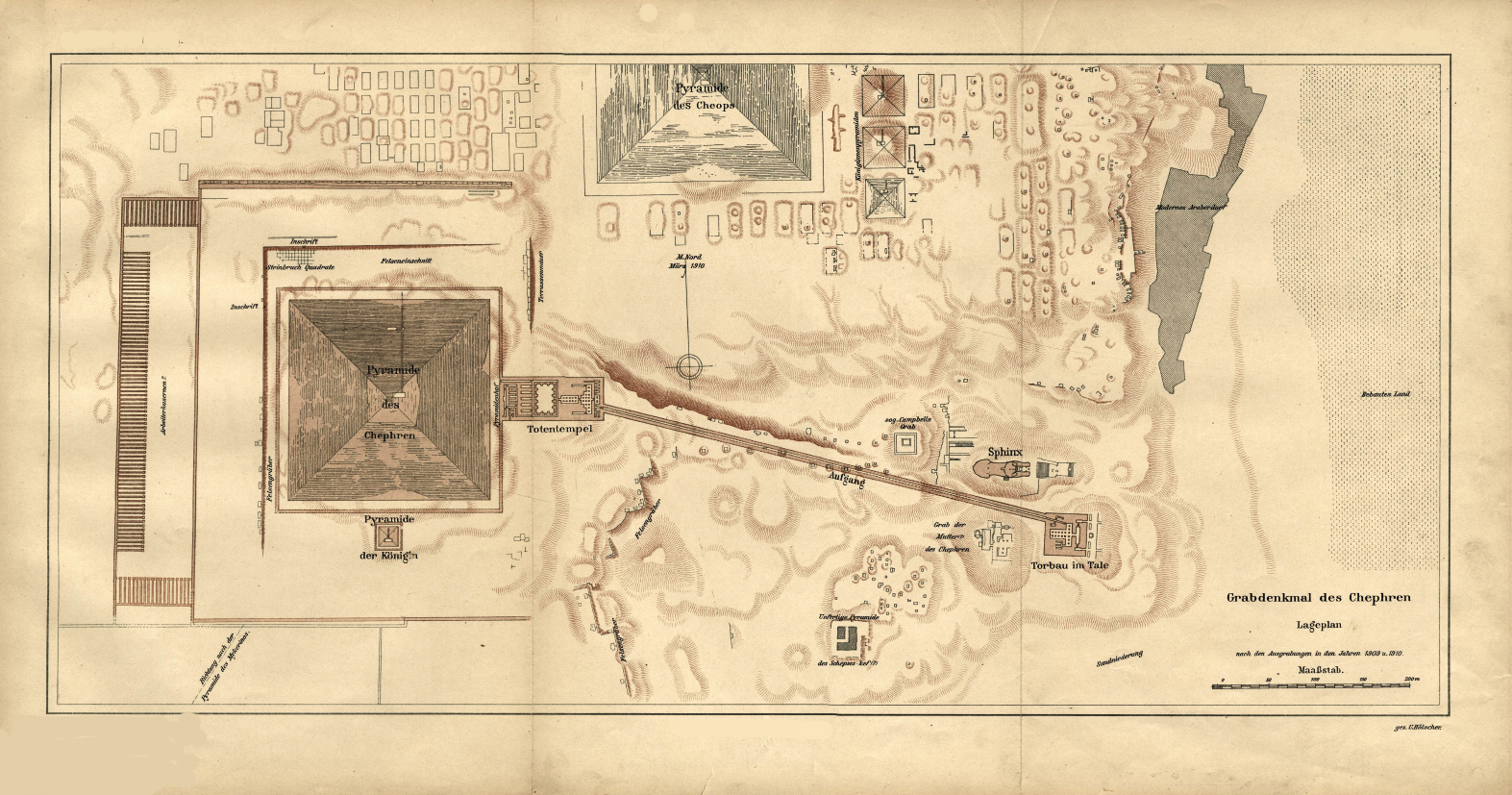
Map of Khafra Giza complex, mortuary temple and valley temple on the access road

The Mastaba of Khafraankh G 7948 (LG 75) is located in a zone Eastern necropolis of Giza on extrema east ridge of necropolis behind a row of G 7000 mastabas, dated to the end of the Fifth dynasty. Initial descriptions of the uncovered mastabas were published by Auguste Mariette, and more detailed ones by Henri Naville. A copy of the inscriptions in the mastaba was made by Emmanuel Rouge during his first visit of mastaba LG75. The architecture and inclusion in the classification of building types, including their mutual comparison in the western and eastern necropolis, were elaborated by Reisner. The decoration of mastaba G 7948 was comprehensively described by Junker. Archaeological, iconographic findings of the expeditions in 1996-2002 were published in the work of E. Kormysheva et al.
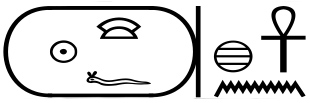
The owner of the mastaba was identified as Khafra-anch, (Ḫˁj=f Rˁ-ˁnh).

== The Mastaba ==
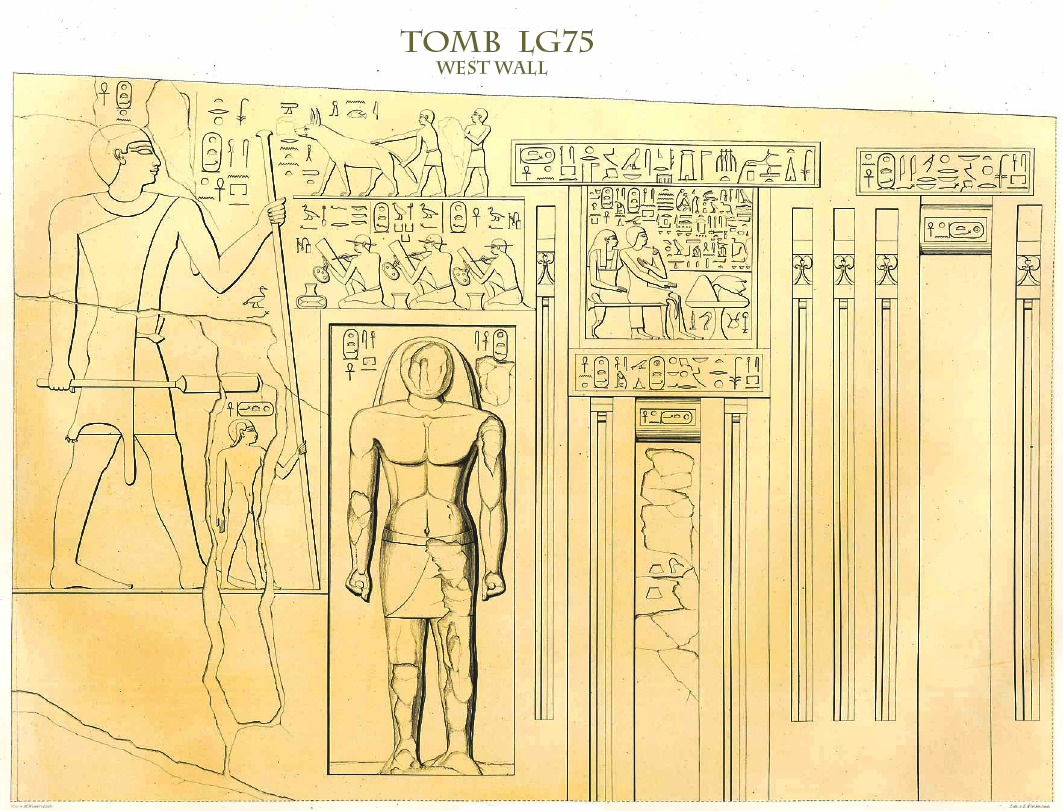
Khafreaankh's niche for a statue; above are figures of his sons Neferekau, Khafrauserkau and Khafraanchas as scribes

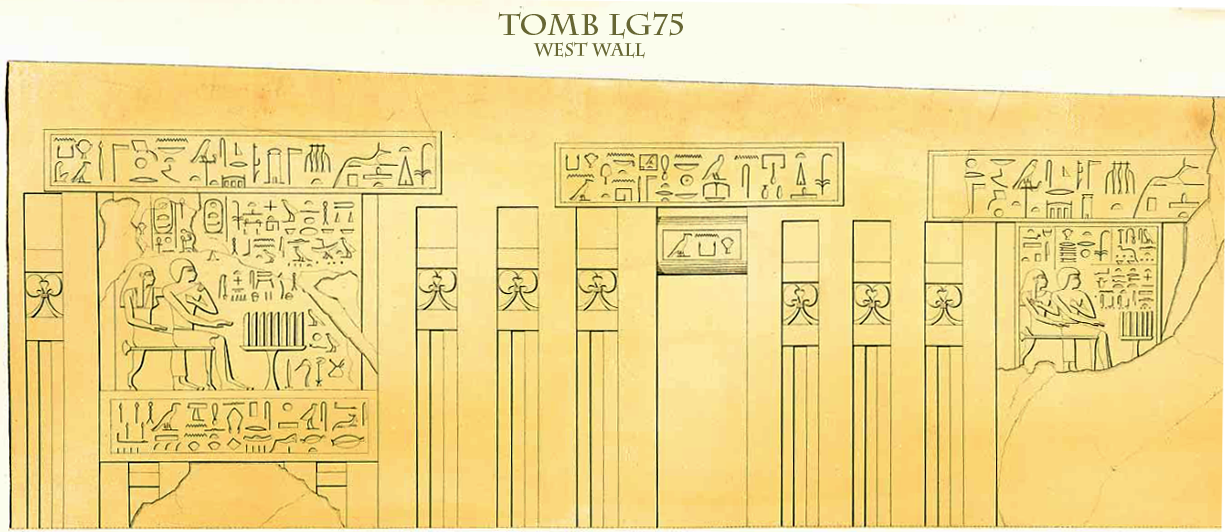
Khafraanch and his wife at the sacrificial tables; above the left table is an inscription

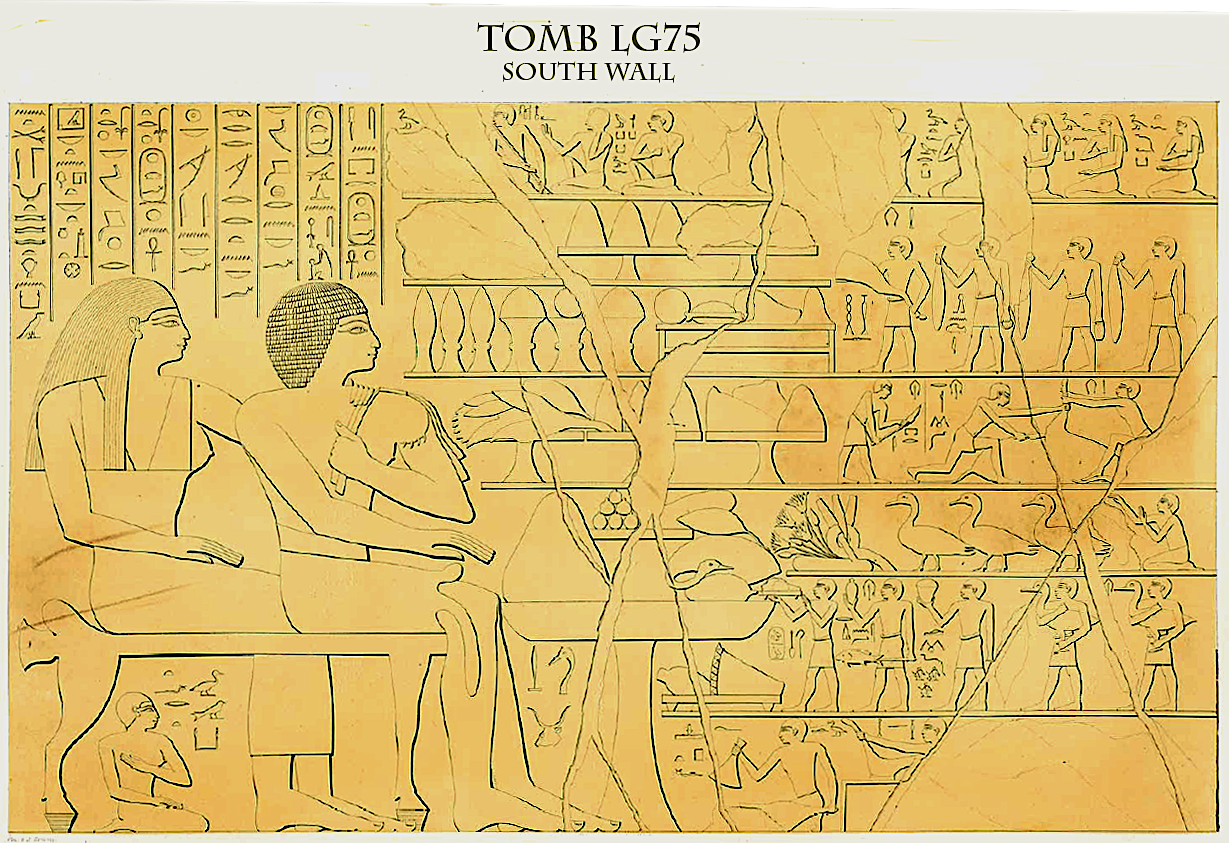
Khafraanch with his wife Herenka; servants bring gifts, daughter Uretka at bottom left

The Mastaba of Khafraankh G 7948 (LG 75) had a hall oriented north–south with an entrance from the east measuring 7.13 m × 3 m (23.4 ft × 9.8 ft). In the West wall there were three pairs of niches and a niche for statue to the south. Later excavated side rooms from the north wall of the hall were decorated with reliefs. The chapel was one large decorated room. Across the side south niche is an inscription on the architrave of the main niche with the name and titles. On the main and side niches is the inscription Khafra-ankh, and on the side niche of the middle the name "Herenka the wife of Khafraankh" . There were three shafts and burial chambers, where Khafraankh, his wife Herenka and their relatives Ishepet (Note: Kafraanch’s daughter and his husband Herimeru) and probably Herimeru were also buried. The chambers of her wife and relatives of Khafraankh are oriented on the line east–west, and the chamber of the s owner's oriented on the axis north–south. The Khafraankh chapel represents a kind of rock-cut chapel with reliefs in only one room comparable with L-shaped offering room and well decorated rock-cut tombs with reliefs in one room only. The complex is dated to the end of the Fourth to the first part of the Fifth dynasty.

== Interior decoration ==
The quite well preserved decoration in the mastaba chapel LG75 was recorded by Lepsius, redrawn and lithographically printed. A general description of the chapel decoration was given by Junker and later Kormysheva et al.

=== Entrance ===
The entrance door is formed of massive blocks 2.2 m (7.2 ft) high with a cylindrical lintel, which is filled with a list of Khafraankhh titles.

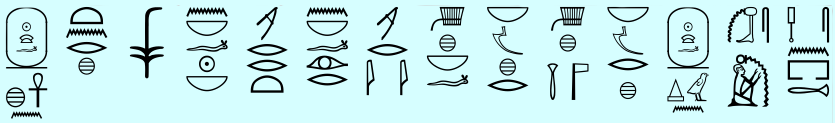
Inscription on the lintel of the entrance door; Khafraanch titles

The friend of the Great house, the supervisor of wab-priests. (Note: The wab priests performed all necessary rituals and maintained the cult temple)
of the Pyramid “Great-is-Khafra”, lord of reverence with great god,
lord of reverence with his lord, whom his lord loves, creating that
his lord likes every day, Royal acquaintance Khafraankh

The title of the inspector of wab priests specifies the concrete duties of Khafraankh to organise their services in the funeral temple at the Khafra pyramid, the second large pyramid of ancient Egypt and accordingly one of the largest funeral temples of Egypt of the Old Kingdom. Wab-priests served in Hwt-nTr (Priest) of the royal pyramid; they also could execute the functions at the moment of death. The great number of the officials carrying these titles is known from the time of the Dynasties V and VI.

=== Western wall ===
Carved out as a palace front, with six doors; to the left of the first southern false door, the tomb owner with staff and sceptre, in front of him his son. To the right of it, the statue of the deceased is carved in a niche, above it two strips of images. Above, a fat hyena is brought in, below, three scribes, with the names of his sons, make records. On the plate of the first false door, the married couple in front of a table with two large loaves of bread and a goose. There is in an above frame the script adoration king and god Anubis.

Inscription in a frame above the southern offering table of the false door G 7948

A boon that the king gives, a boon that Anubis gives, foremost of divine booth to receive
the burial as the lord of reverence with the great god, servant of the Great house Khafraankh

In the upper frame above the false door to burial shaft wife Herenka there is an inscription of her titles.

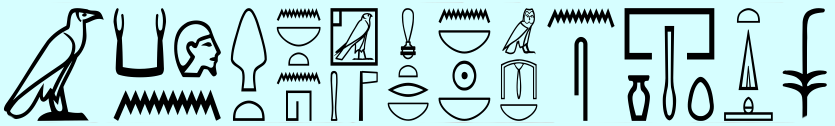
Wife Herenka's titles

A boon, which king gives, invocation offerings of bread, beer, for all feast and
for every day for Lady mitre, priestess of Hathor, Mistress of sycamore, Herenka

=== South wall ===
The couple in front of a table laden with food is daughter Uretka crouching under the armchair. Above the table are three rows of foods on plates and saucers, wine and beer mugs, bouquets of flowers. On the right six rows of images, musicians and singers, behind them crouching the children of the deceased, servants with foods, slaughter scene, geese, servants with dishes, pieces of meat, fish on a spit, two servants with geese, preparation of the food, roasting the goose on a spit.

=== East wall ===
The tomb owner is leaning comfortably on the staff watching the work in the field; behind him stays his brother Iteti; (Note: Badawey states the kinship of a brother, according to the entry in tomb G7391 "Funerary priest" [hm-kˁ ] Iteti) next to him is his dog, and in front of him is a servant shielding with a large umbrella. On the right are six registers of images. From above rowing and sailing boats are depicted. The next depicts piling up the grain stacks, dragging away the sheaves, donkeys threshing grain, throwing up the stacks, celebrate up stele of the harvest goddess. The scribe hands over the list settling accounts with the shepherds. On the right are the grain harvest, which the owner of the tomb is watching. The first holding open a papyrus is Khafraanch's son Khafrauserkau, and his brothers Khafraankh and Neferkau typing behind him. On the right sheaves are tied up in sacks, and accounts are being settled with the shepherds. On the right, birds are catching fish with a net; behind this is seen the gutting and carrying away of the fish. In the lower two registers, the herds of castles are listed by their number of heads. The number of bulls is 837, then goats – 2,235, donkeys – 760 and sheep – 974. A depiction of fishing with a net shows various realistic fishes that may be assigned species markings: as Tilapia nilotica, and as Barbus bynni, for example.

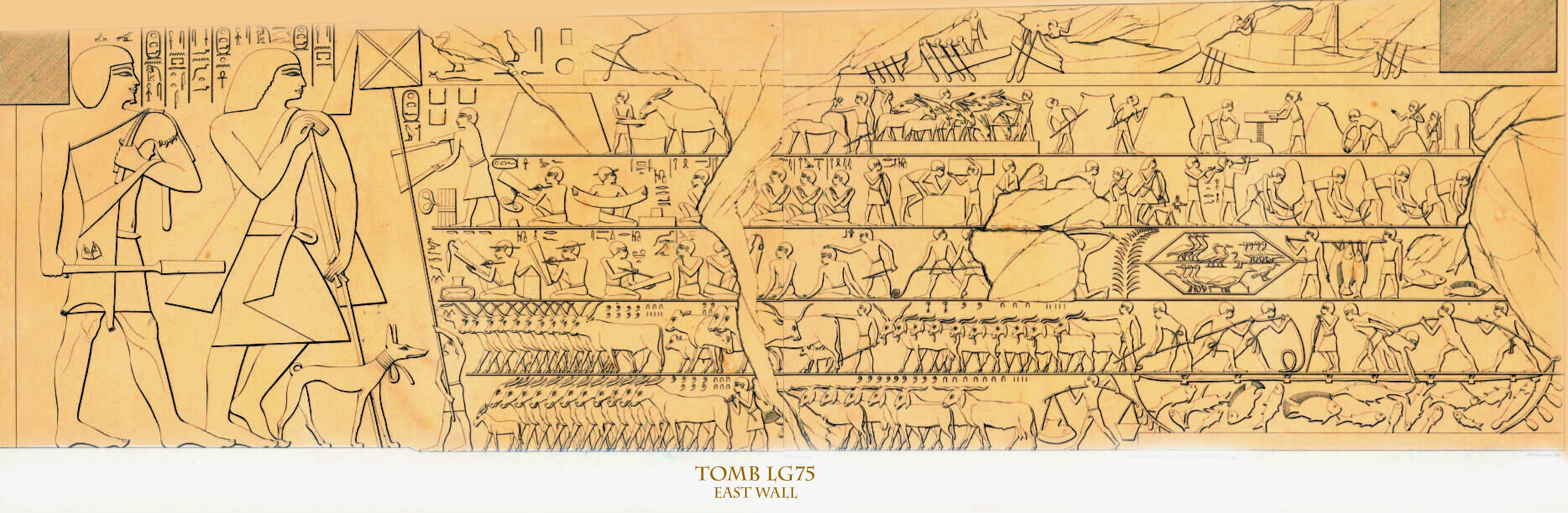
Tomb LG75-East wall Khafraanch's farm life

== Epilogue ==
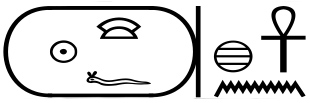
Each ruler in the old kingdom built his own mortuary complex, in which mortuary rituals took place after his death. Hundreds of priests took an active part every day, and their number logically grew as the number of these complexes increased historically. Temple complexes in the Fifth dynasty already constituted economic units-estates, the proceeds of which ensured the continuation of the cult of the ruler, in this case Khafra, and the life of priests devoted to the cult of the king in the pyramid city in order to ensure proper spiritual care for the deceased divine king in his temple complex. (Note: GPS 29.9759928N, 31.1325522E) Khafraankh as inspector of wab priests was one of them. Although there is no detailed information available about the duration of the mortuary cult of the king Khafra, his mortuary temple adjacent to the pyramid itself is still one of the best preserved monuments. The richness of the estate presented by Khafraankh is evidenced by the depiction on the southern wall of the mastaba. Abundant influxes of sacrificial animals and a general picture of economic activities can be documented in other temples, such as the Ptah temple in Memphis. The connection between the sun temples and the funerary temples expressed the very ancient ideology of the Egyptian kingship and promoted the power of the kings over their own economic establishments, both during their lifetime, when they built the temples and after their death when their cult was maintained.
