= Charles Lenormant =

French archaeologist (1802–1859)

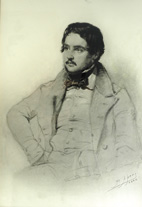
Charles Lenormant

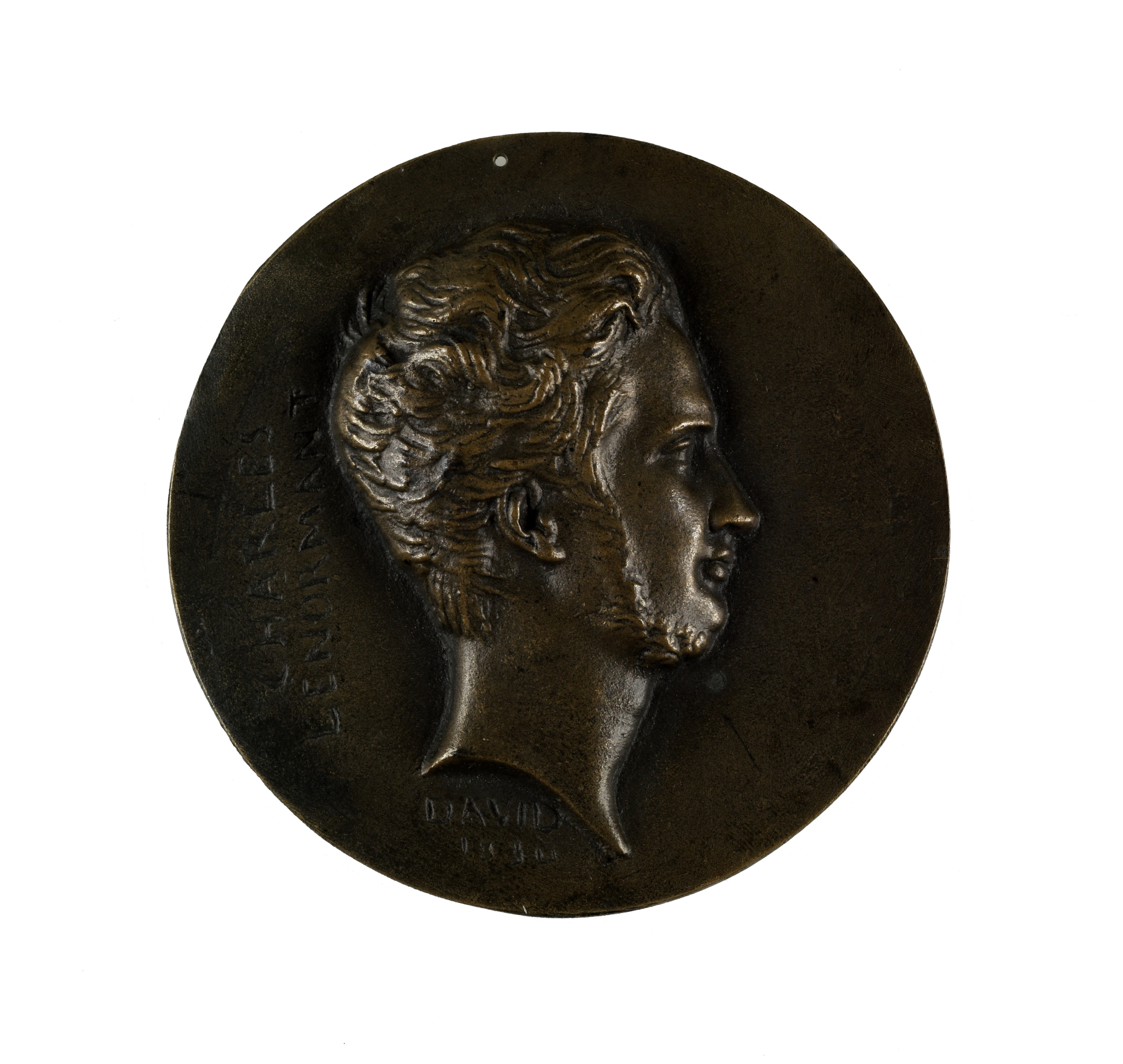
Medallion of Lenormant by d'Angers

Charles Lenormant (1 June 1802, Paris – 22 November 1859, Athens) was a French archaeologist.

== Biography ==
After pursuing his studies at the Lycée Charlemagne and the Lycée Napoléon, he took up law, but a visit to Italy and Sicily (1822–23) made him an enthusiastic archaeologist. In 1825 he was named sub-inspector of fine arts and a few months later married Amelia Syvoct, niece and adopted daughter of the French socialite Juliette Récamier. He visited Italy, Belgium, and the Netherlands, and accompanied Jean-François Champollion to Egypt in July 1828, where he devoted himself to the study of architectural works.

Later, in March 1829, Lenormant travelled through Greece as assistant director of the archaeological department of the Morea scientific expedition. On his return he was appointed curator of the works of art in the Royal Library. Although the chair was that of modern history, he lectured chiefly on ancient history, particularly the origins of Greek civilization. In 1836 he was appointed curator of printed books in the Royal Library, and in 1839 was elected a member of the Academy. In 1840 he was made curator of the Cabinet of Medals.

François Guizot, who became minister of foreign affairs in 1841, sent Lenormant on a mission to Greece. On returning from this second visit to the East, Lenormant continued his lectures at the Sorbonne, making a particular study of the sources of Christian civilization. This study made him a true Christian, and from that time his lectures bore the impression of his deep Catholic belief. He gave voice to his convictions in his Questions historiques (Paris 1845), in his work on the Associations religieuses dans la société chrétienne (Paris 1866), and in many articles in the French Catholic review Correspondant. His writings greatly influenced the much-discussed question of freedom of teaching (liberté d'enseignement).

In 1846, the students of the Sorbonne, in retaliation for his part in the suppression of Edgar Quinet's chair, compelled Lenormant to give up his professorship; he was then given the editorship of the Correspondent, which be resigned in 1855. In 1848 he was named director of the commission of historical monuments, and in 1849 an almost unanimous vote of the members of the Academy appointed him to the chair of archaeology in the Collège de France. From that time he devoted himself entirely to the teaching of Egyptian archaeology. He died while on an expedition undertaken for the sake of initiating his son into the knowledge of the monuments of antiquity. His grave is on the Colonus hilltop in Athens next to that of Karl Otfried Müller.

== Published works ==
Many articles written by Lenormant appeared in the Annales de l'Institut archéologique de Rome, the Mémoires de l'Académie des Inscriptions, the Revue de Numismatique, and the Correspondant. His chief independently published works are:

- Les Artistes contemporains (Paris, 1833, 2 vols.)
- Introduction à l'histoire de l'Asie occidentale (Paris, 1838)
- Musée des Antiquités égyptiennes (Paris, 1842)
- Questions historiques (Paris, 1845)

along with two valuable collections:

- Trésor de numismatique et de glyptique (Paris, 1834—50) (in collaboration with Paul Delaroche and Henriquel Dupont)
- Élite des monuments céramographiques (1844—58) (with Jean de Witte).

== Sources ==
- Jean de Witte, Annuaire de l'Académie de Belgique (Brussels, 1861). 129-86.
- Mémoires de l'Institut de France, XXXI, (Paris), p. 547—608.
- Based on text from F. Mayence.

Preceded by Jean Antoine Letronne	Chair of Archeology at the Collège de France; 1849–1859	Succeeded by Emmanuel de Rougé
