= Emmanuel de Rougé =

French politician, philologist, and egyptologist (1811–1872)

Olivier-Charles-Camille-Emmanuel de Rougé,
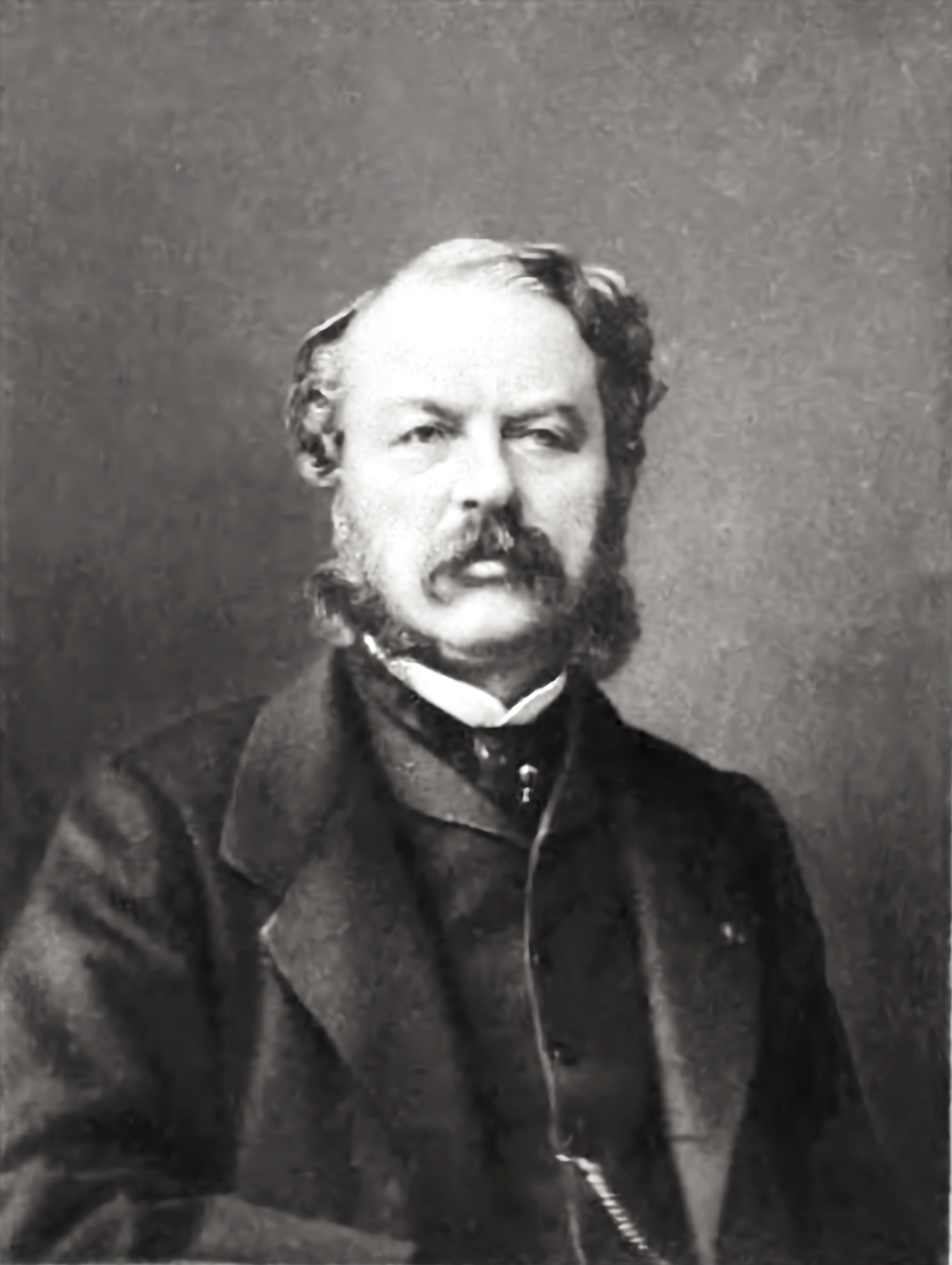
- Born: 11 April 1811; Paris
- Died: 27 December 1872 (aged 61); Château de Bois Dauphin
- Occupations: Professor, archaeologist, egyptologist, curator of museums and orientalists
- Known for: Professor, archaeologist, egyptologist, curator of museums and orientalistsConservator of museums of the Department of Egyptian Antiquities of the Louvre (1849-1854) Consejero de Estado (1854-1870) Alcalde de Précigné (1865-1872)
- Awards: Commander of the National Order of the Legion of Honor (1870)

Vicomte Olivier Charles Camille Emmanuel de Rouge (11 April 1811 – 27 December 1872) was a French Egyptologist, philologist and a member of the House of Rougé.

== Biography ==
He was born on 11 April 1811, in Paris, the son of Charles Camille Augustin de Rougé, Count de Rougé and Adelaide Charlotte de la Porte de Riantz (1790–1852).

He was a member of the Order of the Legion of Honour, member of the Institut de France, curator of the Egyptian Museum of the Louvre (1849), State Councillor (1854) and professor of Egyptian archaeology at the Collège de France (1864). He wrote several books on Egypt and its history.

He died on 27 December 1872, in Château de Bois-Dauphin to Precigne, Sarthe.

Busts of de Rouge are held in the Louvre and the Cairo Museum in Egypt.

== Publications ==
- Mémoire sur l'inscription du tombeau d'Ahmès, chef des nautoniers (1851)
- Le Poème de Pentaour (1861)
- Rituel funéraire des anciens égyptiens (1861–1863)
- Recherches sur les monuments qu'on peut attribuer aux six premières dynasties de Manéthon (1865)
- Chrestomathie égyptienne, ou Choix de textes égyptiens transcrits, traduits et accompagnés d'un commentaire perpétuel et précédés d'un abrégé grammatical (1867–1876)
- Inscriptions hiéroglyphiques copiées en Égypte pendant la mission scientifique de M. le Vte Emmanuel de Rougé, publiées par M. le Vte Jacques de Rougé (4 volumes, 1877–1879)
- Œuvres diverses (6 volumes, 1907–1918)

== Galerie ==
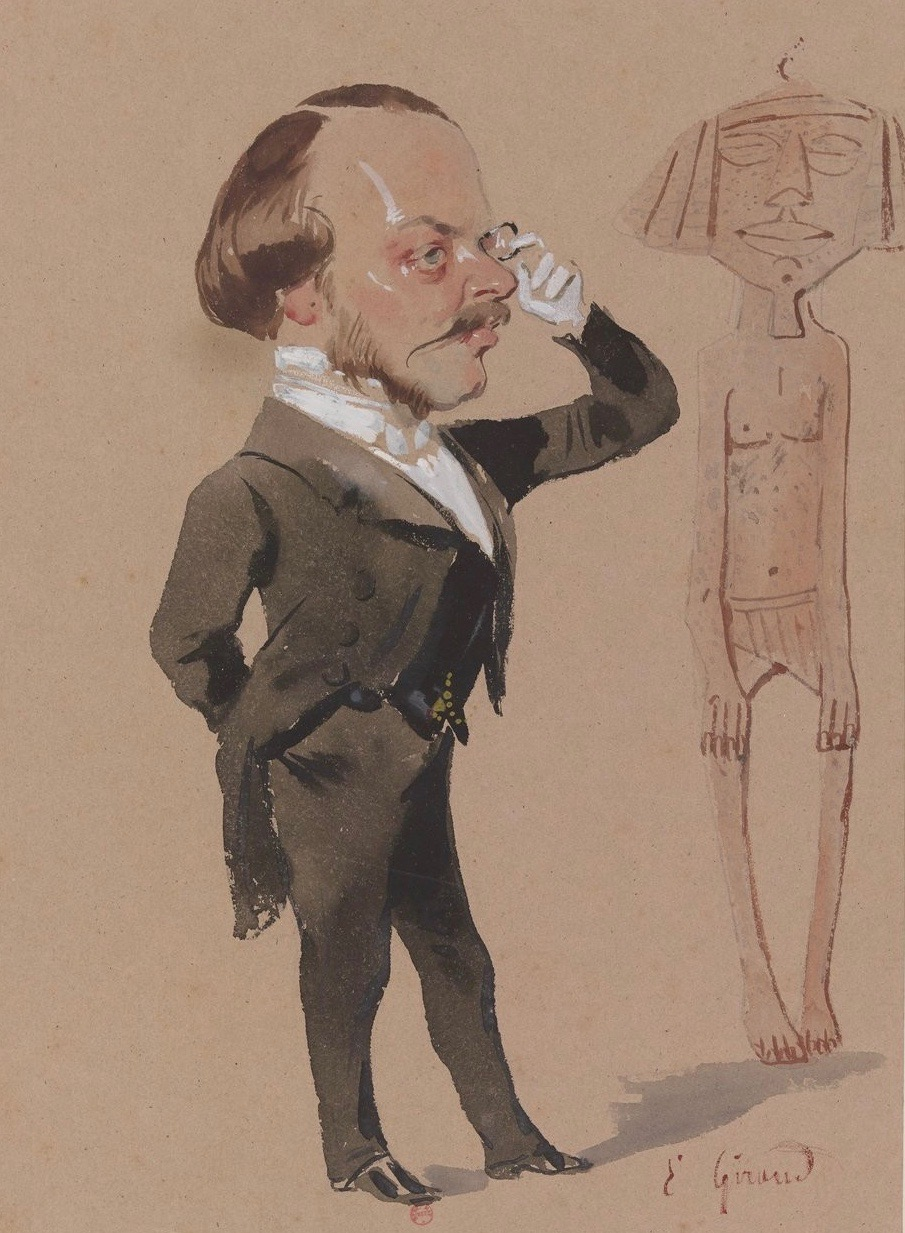
Caricature of de Rougé by Eugène Giraud

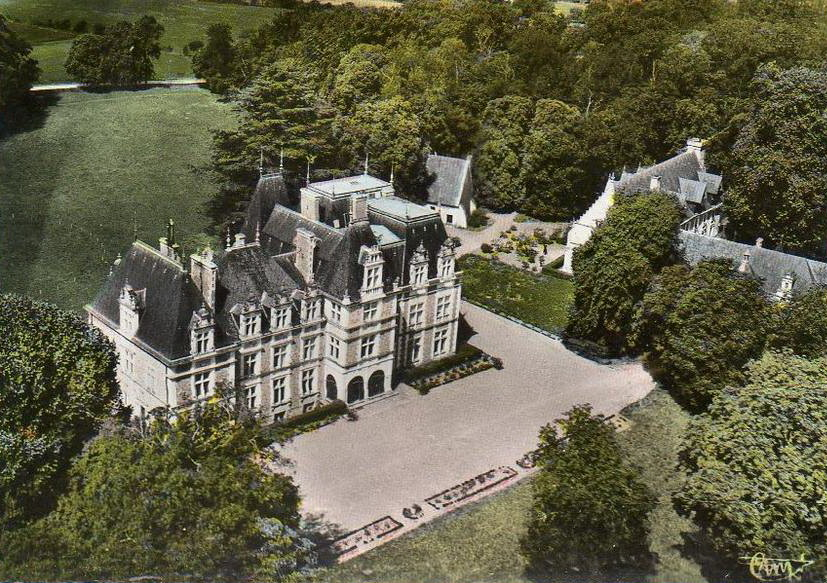
Château de Bois-Dauphin à Précigné, where De Rougé lived and died

Preceded by Charles Lenormant	Chair of Egyptian; Philology and Archeology at the Collège de France; 1860–1872	Succeeded by Gaston Maspero
