= Jules-Émile Saintin =

French painter (1829–1894)

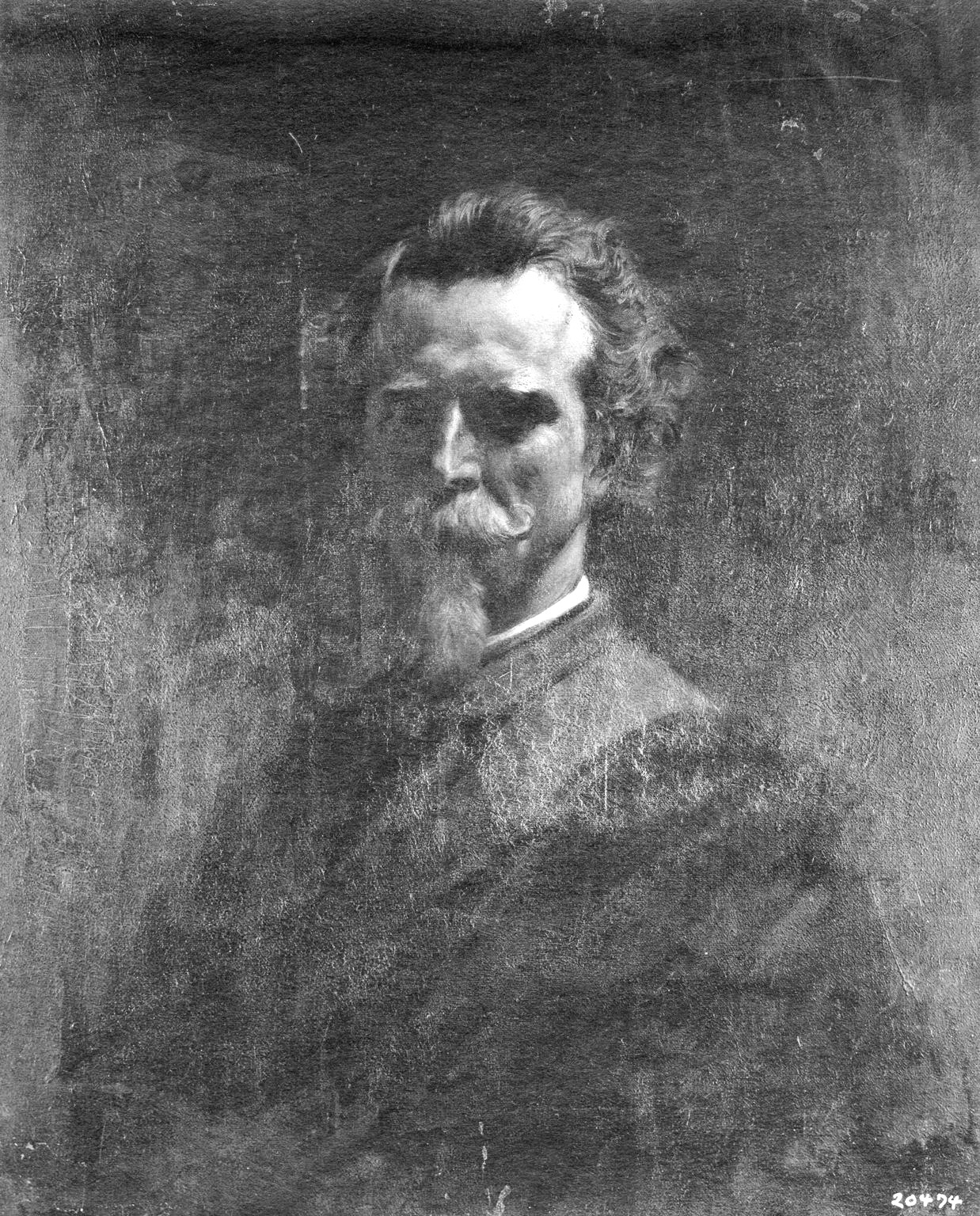
- Born: 14 August 1829; Lemé, France
- Died: 13 July 1894 (aged 64); Paris, France
- Education: Michel Martin Drolling and François-Édouard Picot; Beaux-Arts de Paris
- Known for: Painting
- Movement: Neoclassicism
- Awards: Legion of Honour

Jules-Émile Saintin (14 August 1829 – 13 July 1894) was a neoclassic French painter.

== Biography ==
Jules Émile Saintin was born in Lemé, France. He was a pupil of Michel Martin Drolling and François-Édouard Picot at the Ecole des Beaux-Arts in Paris in 1845. He exhibited pencil portraits at the Salon des artistes français (Salon of French Artists) in 1850 and in 1853.

In April 1854, he went to live and work in the United States, where he painted portraits, landscapes and Indian subjects.

He returned to Paris in 1860 and developed a workshop where he made paintings with American themes, and genre scenes.

In 1876, he was appointed Commissioner of the Centennial Exposition in Philadelphia.

Jules Émile Saintin was a friend of the architect Charles Garnier and the painter Paul Baudry.

He was appointed a Chevalier (Knight) of the Legion of Honour in 1877.

== Works ==
- John C. Breckenridge, Vice President of the United States
- The Pony Express (1863)
- The Small War, Portrait of M. V. Giraud and Mlle. de Sade (1865)
- The Path to War (1865), Musée de la Crèche, Chaumont, Haute-Marne
- Carmella, Marthe, Portrait of Princess Mathilde and Mlle. Edile Riquier (1866)
- Portraits of Mlle. Jouassain and Émilie Dubois (1868)
- Indecision, Deception (1870)
- First Engagement, Self Satisfied (1877)
- Émilienne (1879)
- Flowers of Nice, Abandon (1880)
- At Tuileries, Near the Sea (1882)
- Autumn Night (1887)
- Brumaire, La Roche-aux-Mouettes (1888)

== Gallery ==
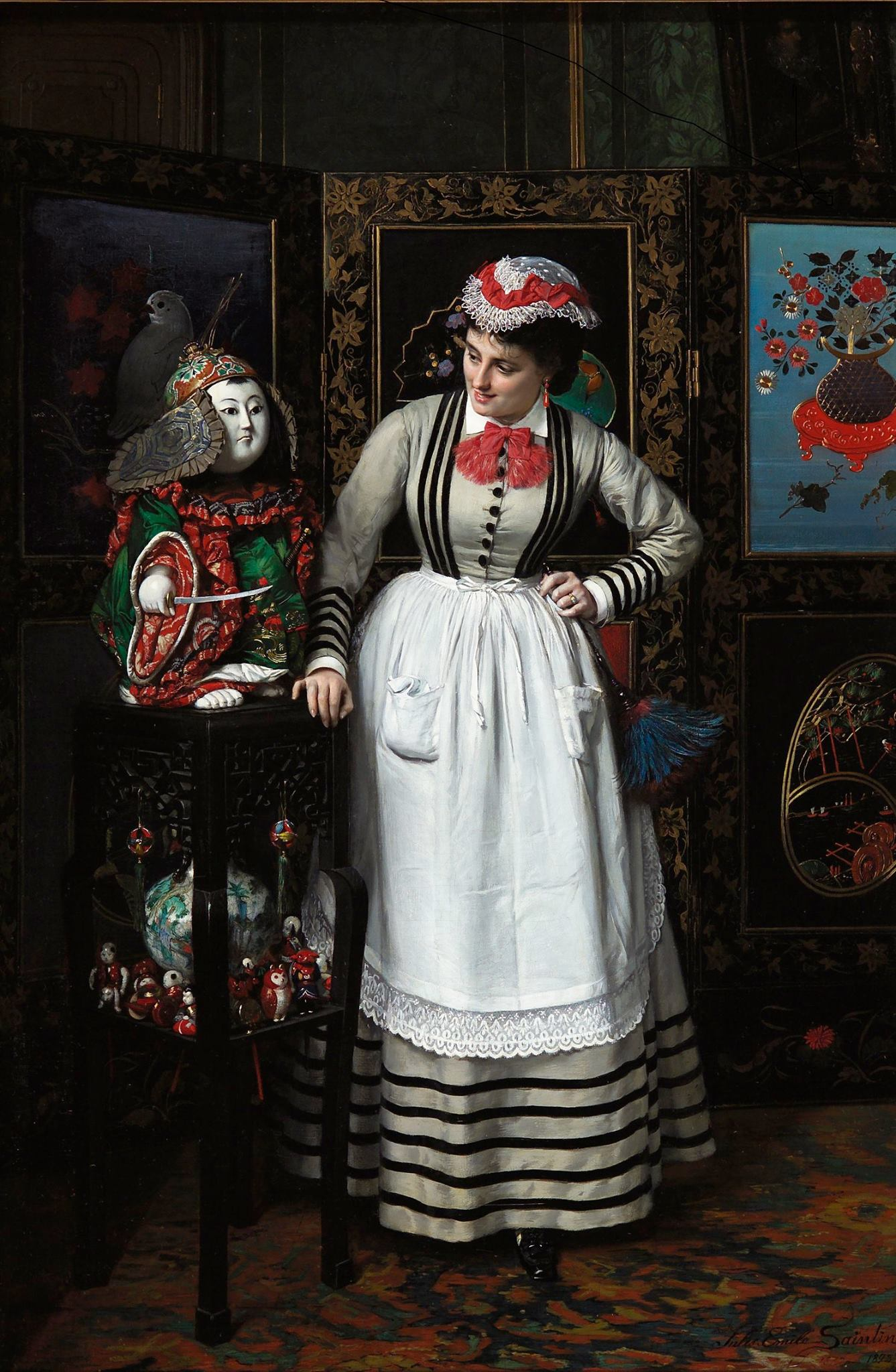
Two Oracles, Arnot Art Museum

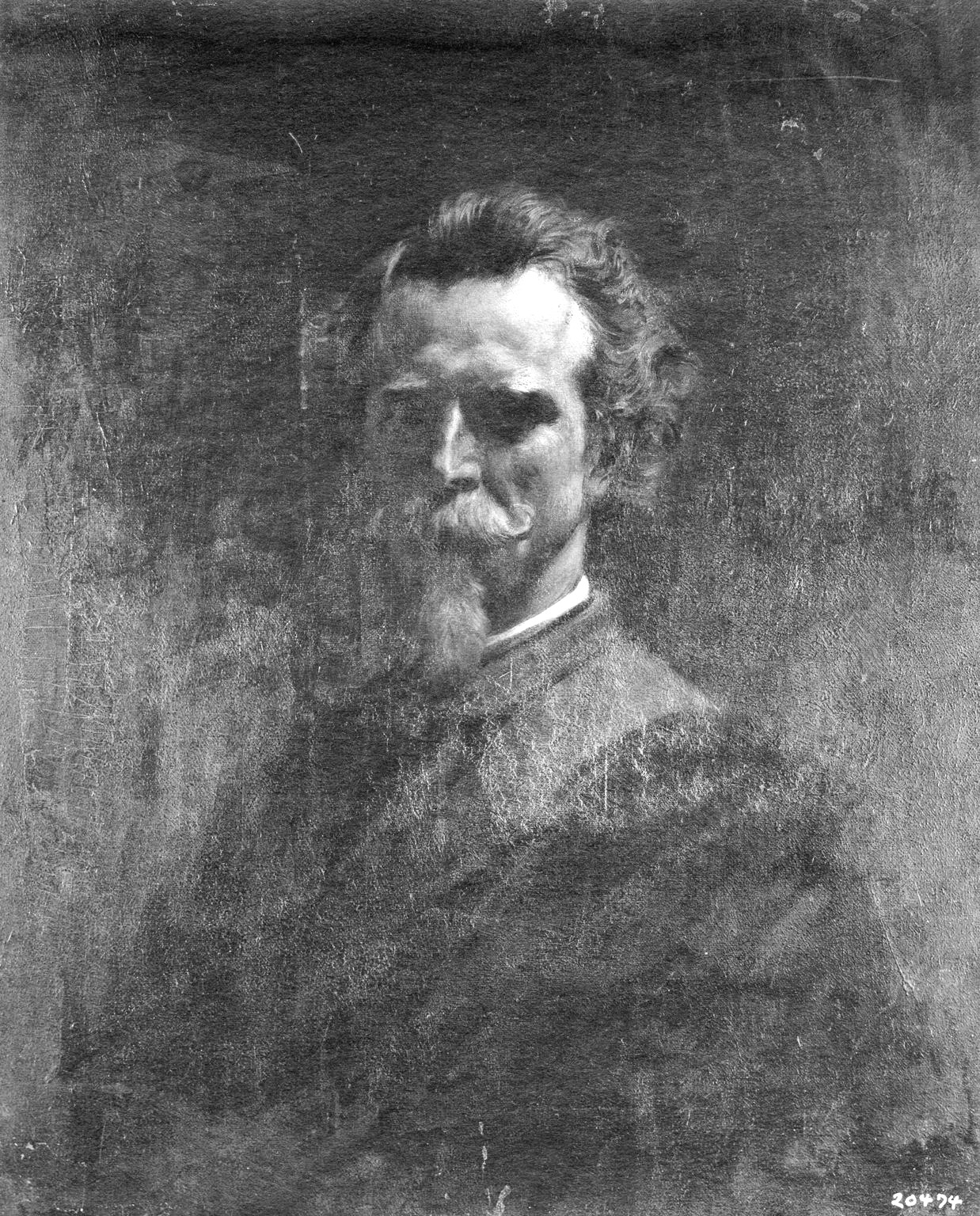
Self portrait

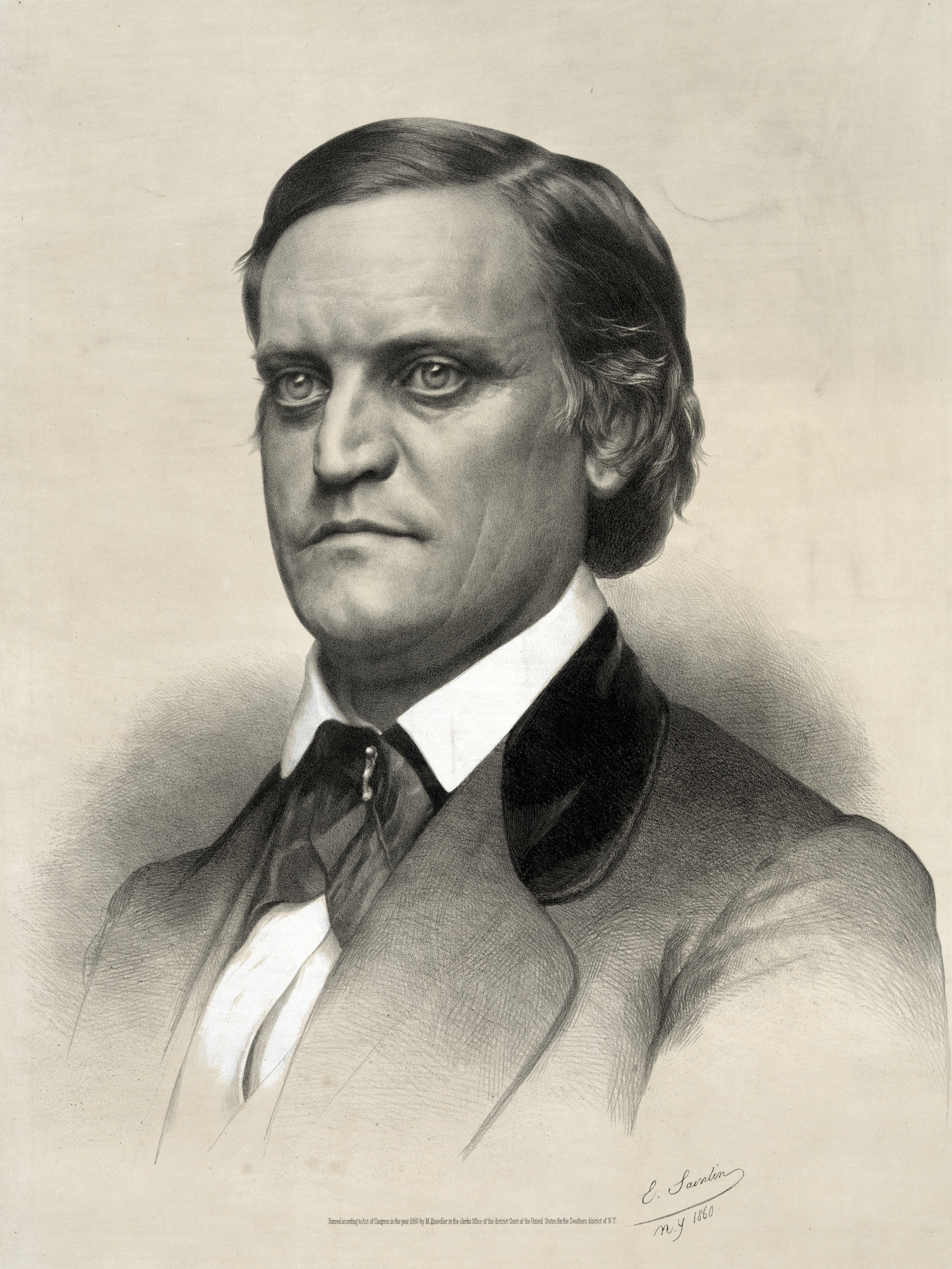
Portrait of John C. Breckenridge

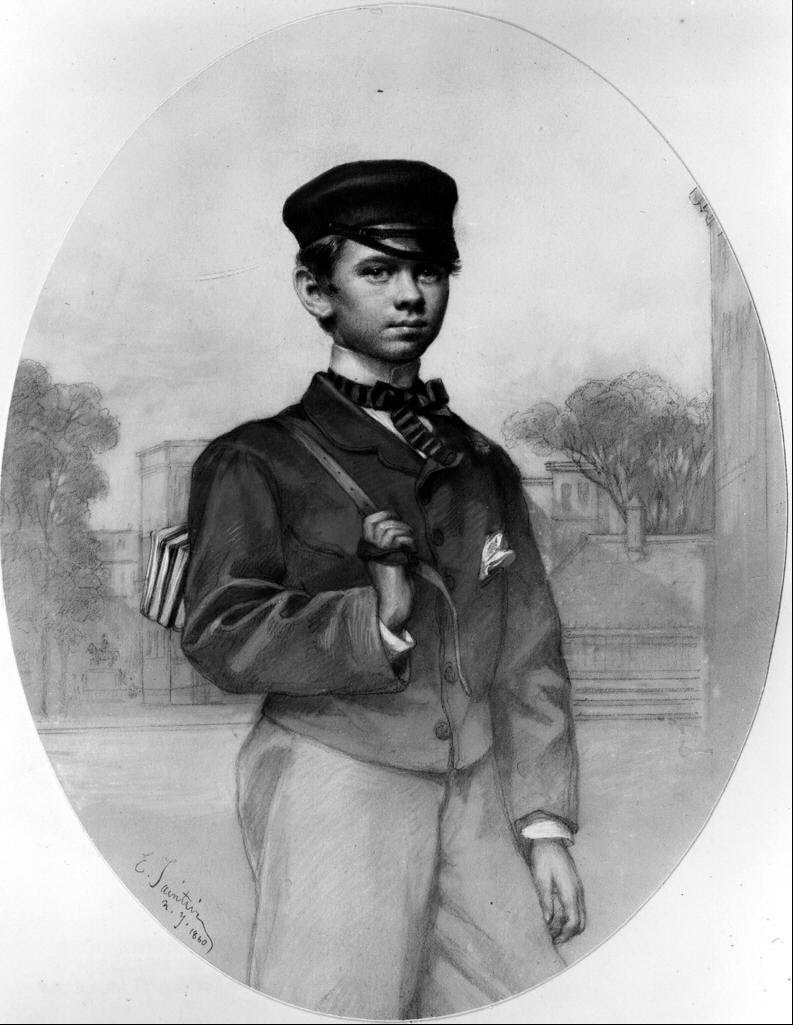
Schoolboy

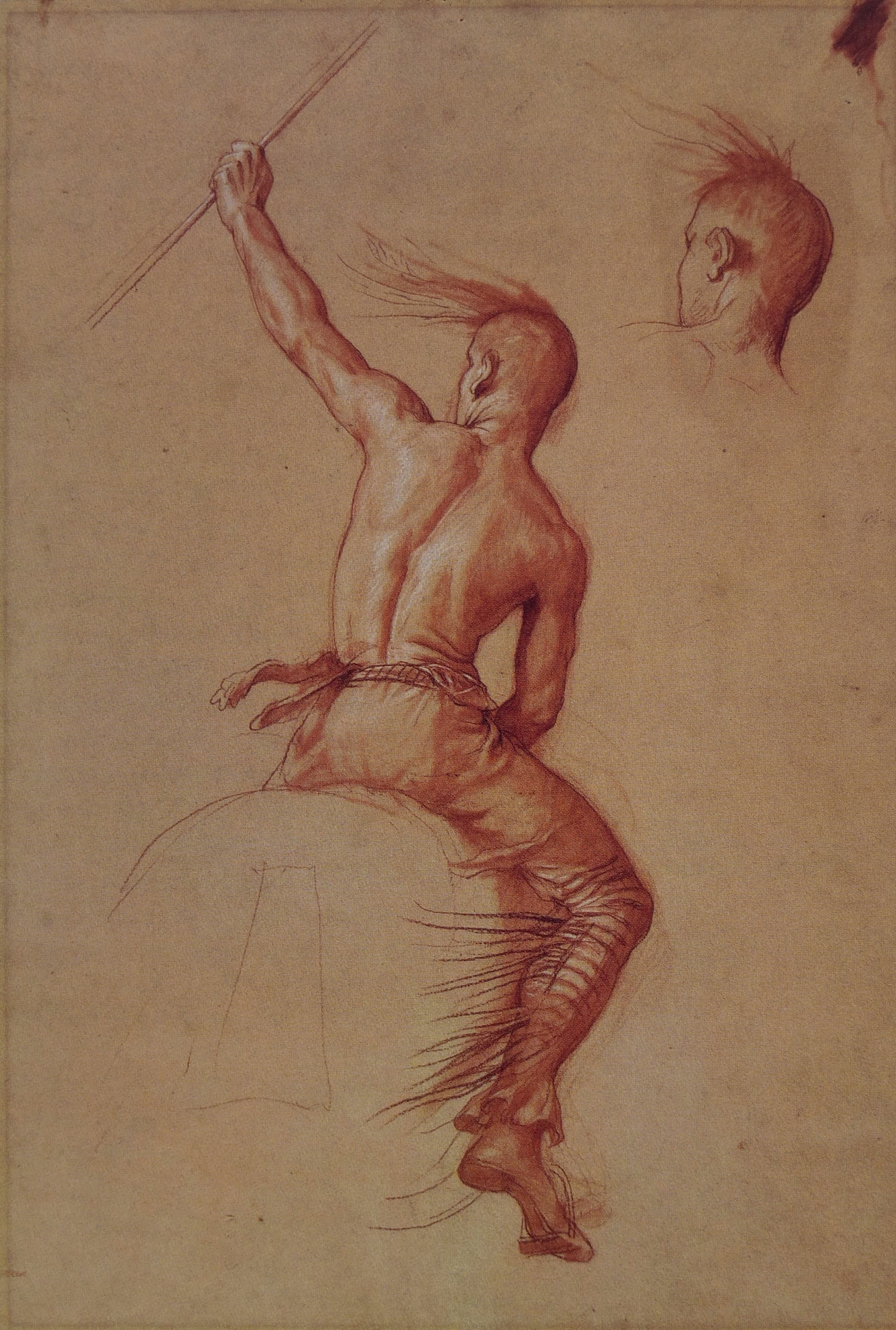
Indien à cheval (Indian on horseback)

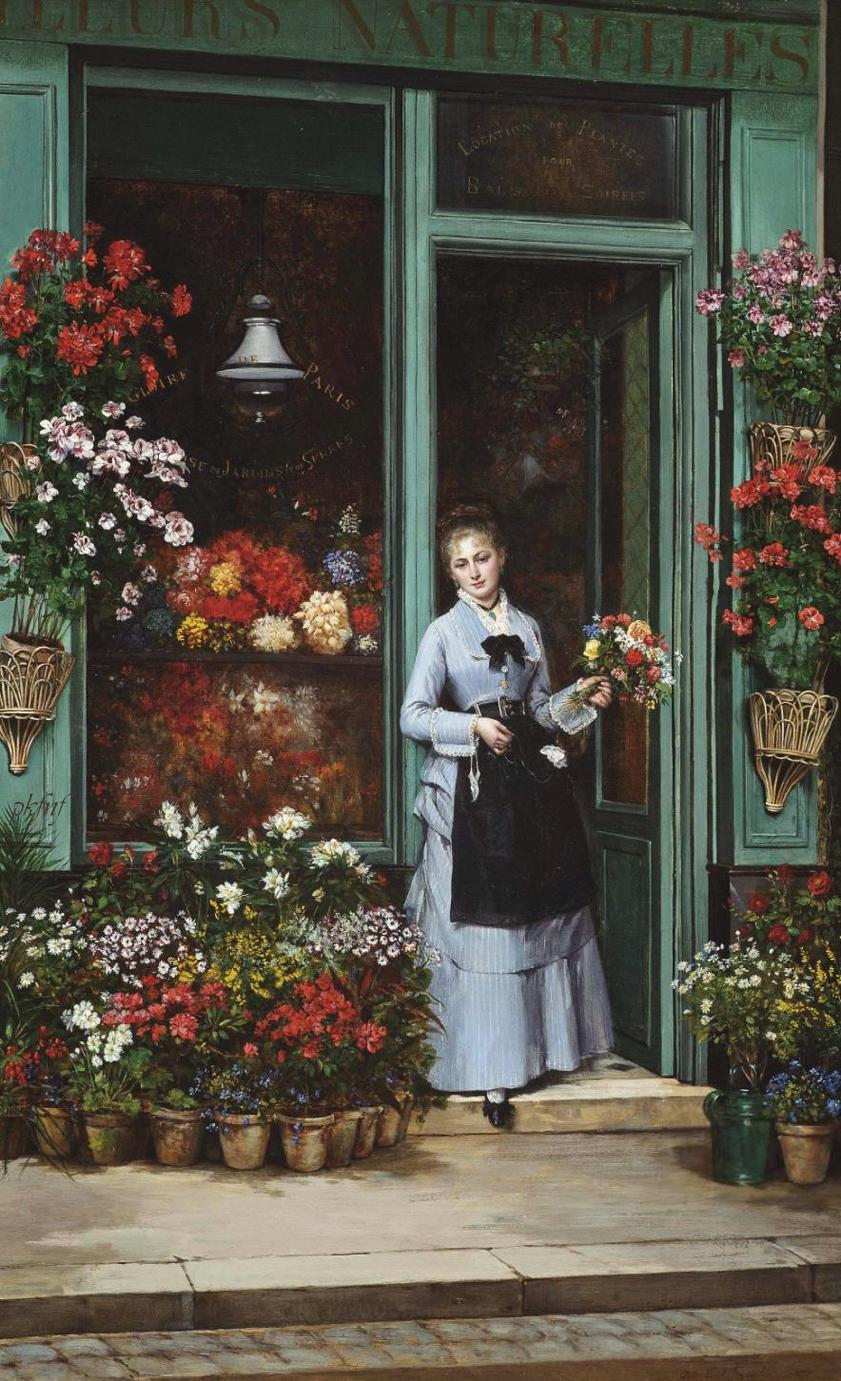
La bouquetière (The Flower Seller)

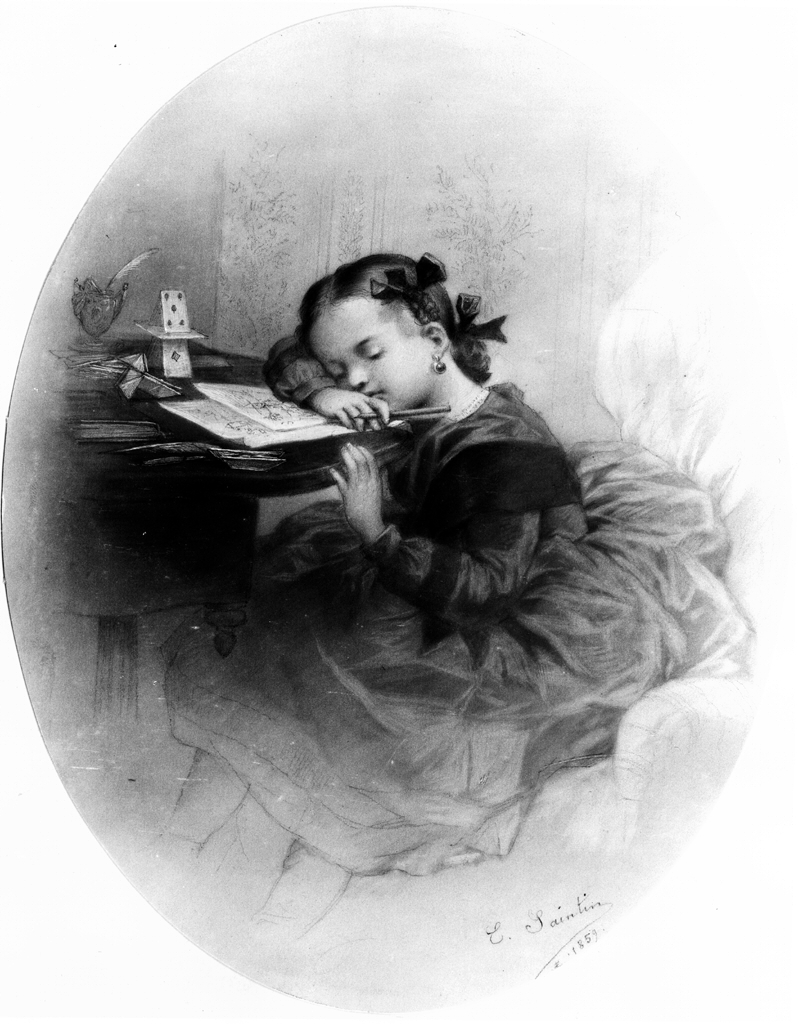
Little Girl Drowsing Over Her Drawing

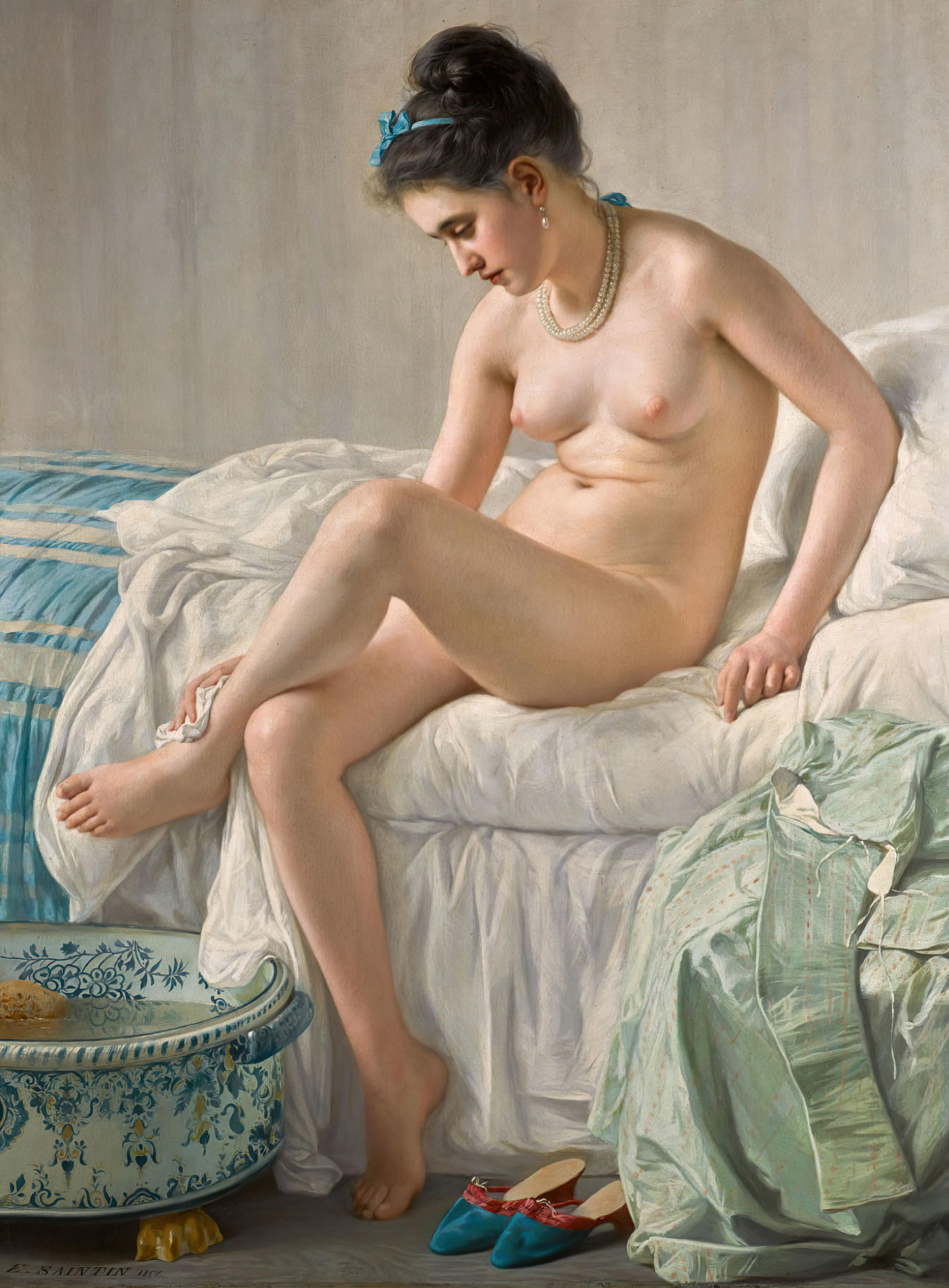
The Washing Up

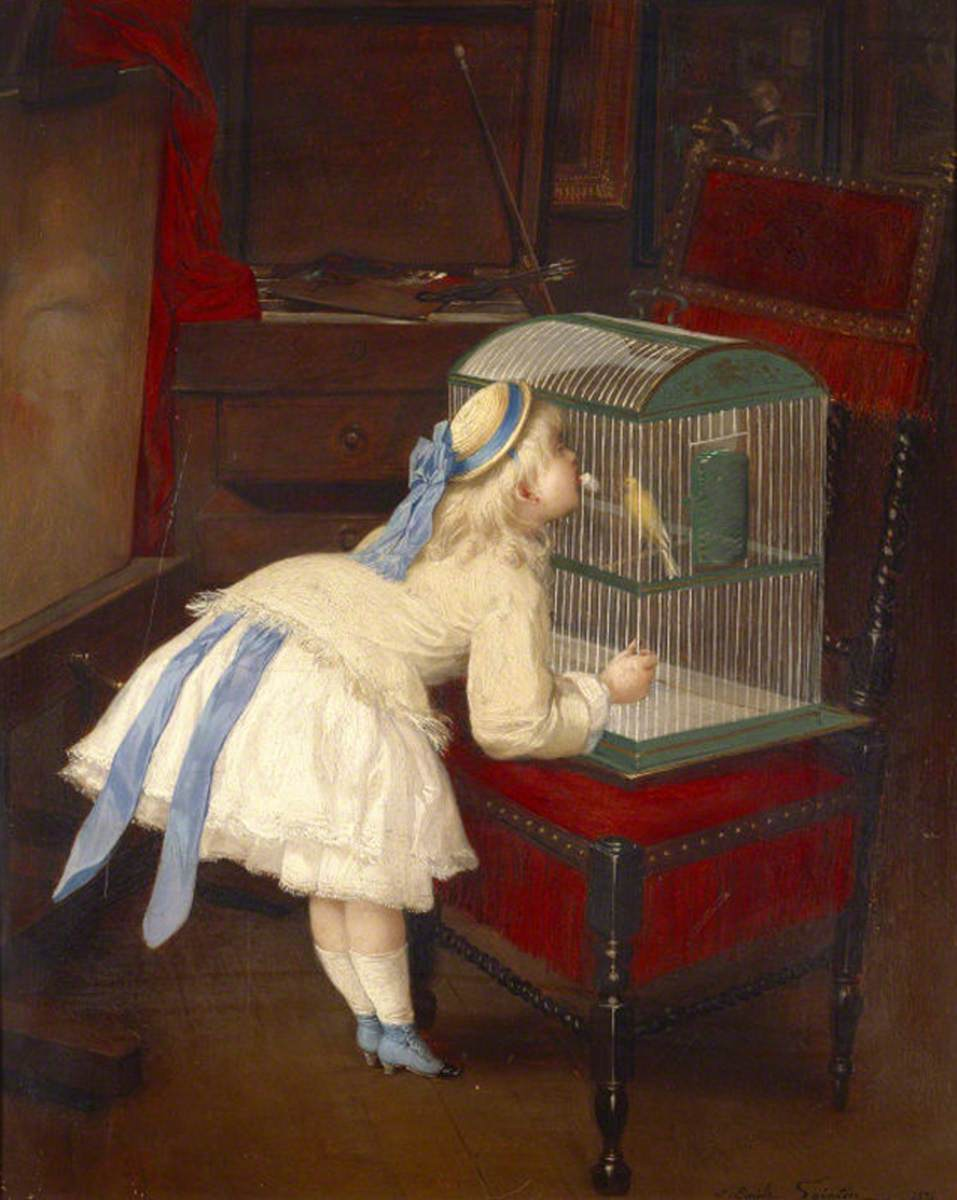
'Fair Shares'

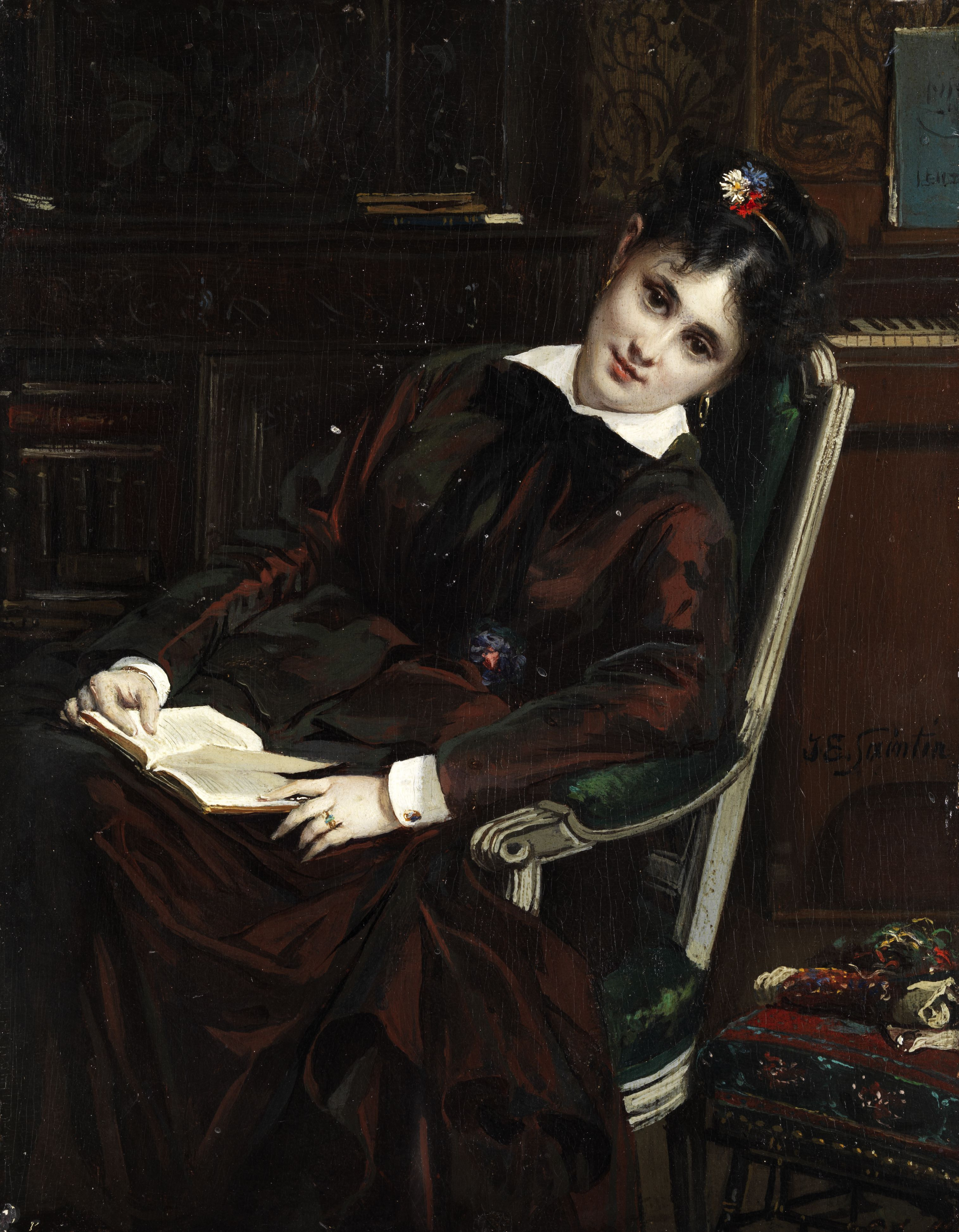
Young woman reading

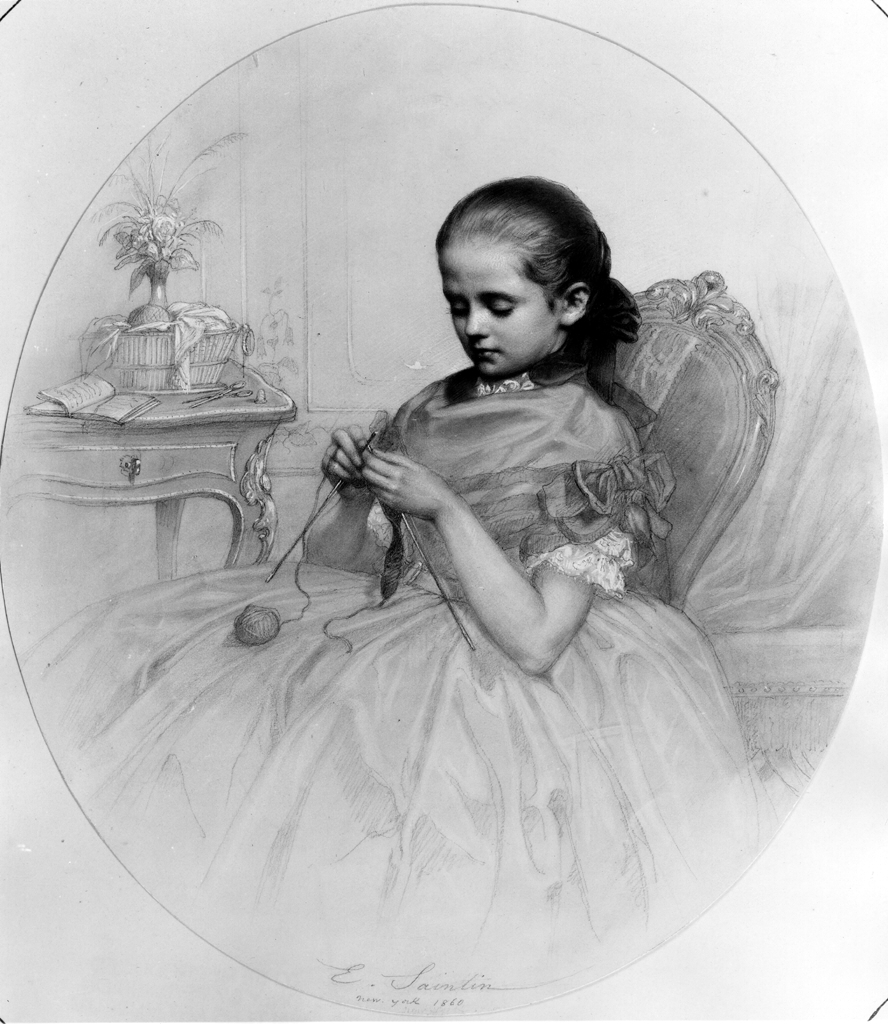
Young Girl Knitting

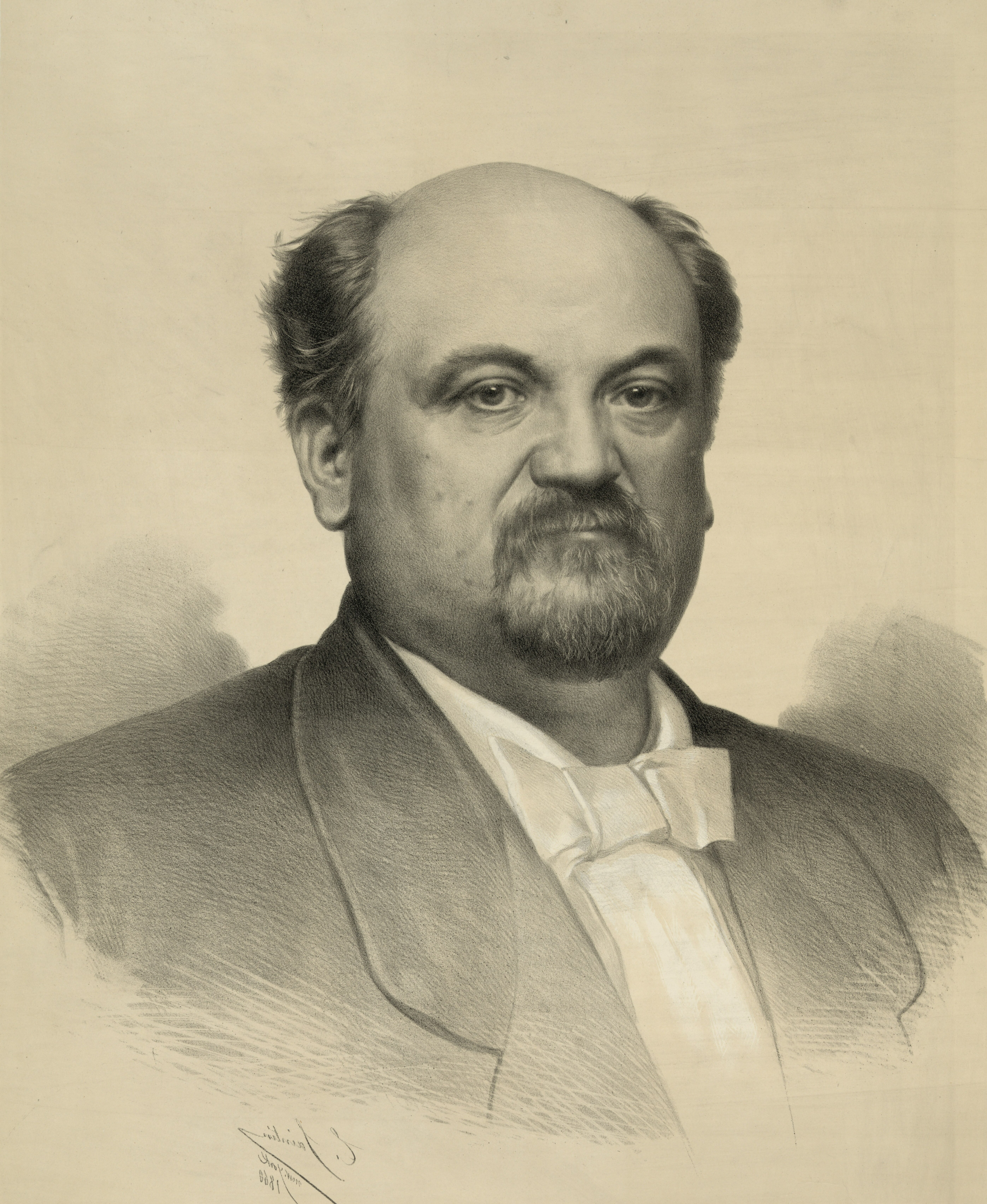
Portrait of Claudius Berger

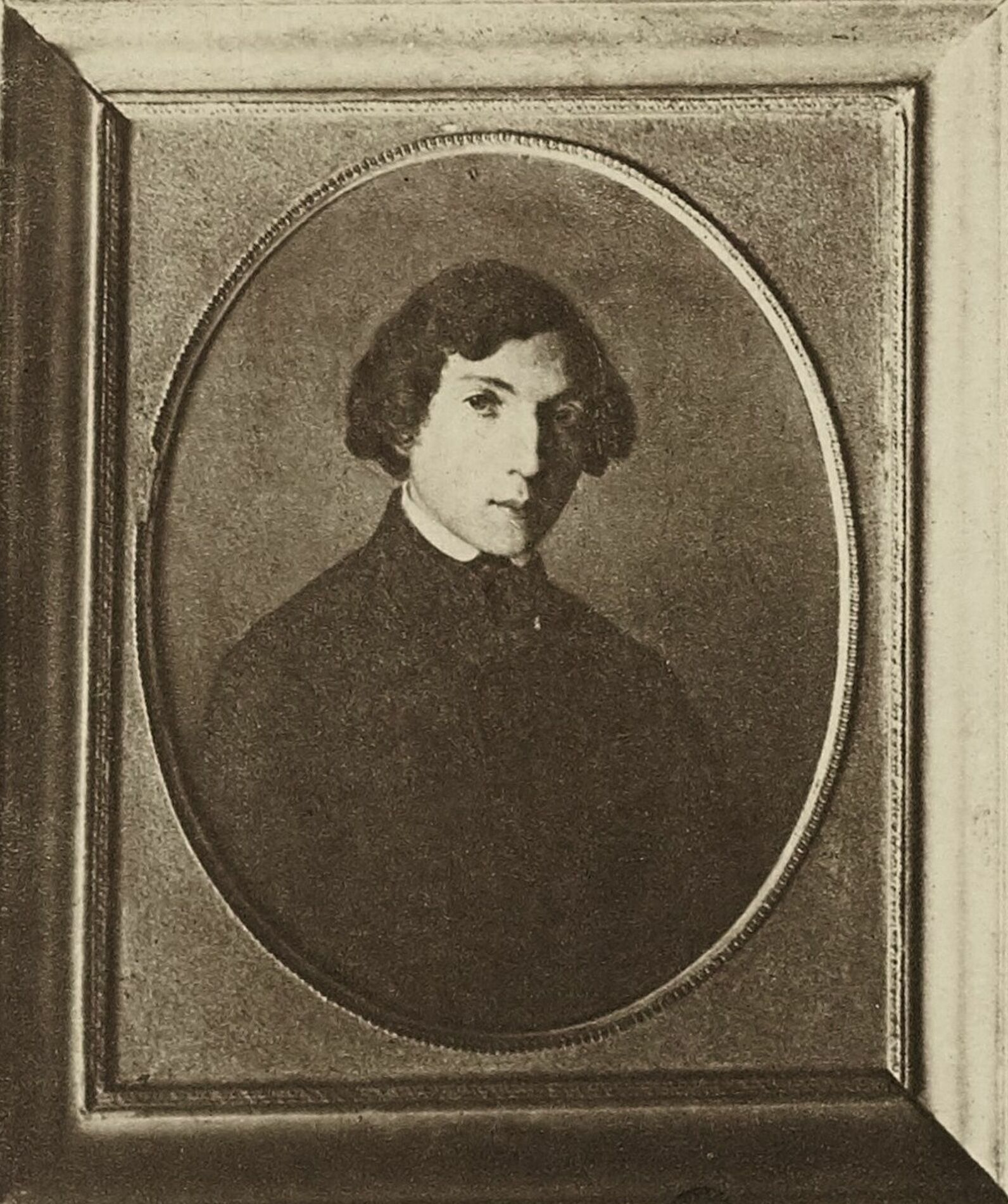
Portrait of Charles Garnier

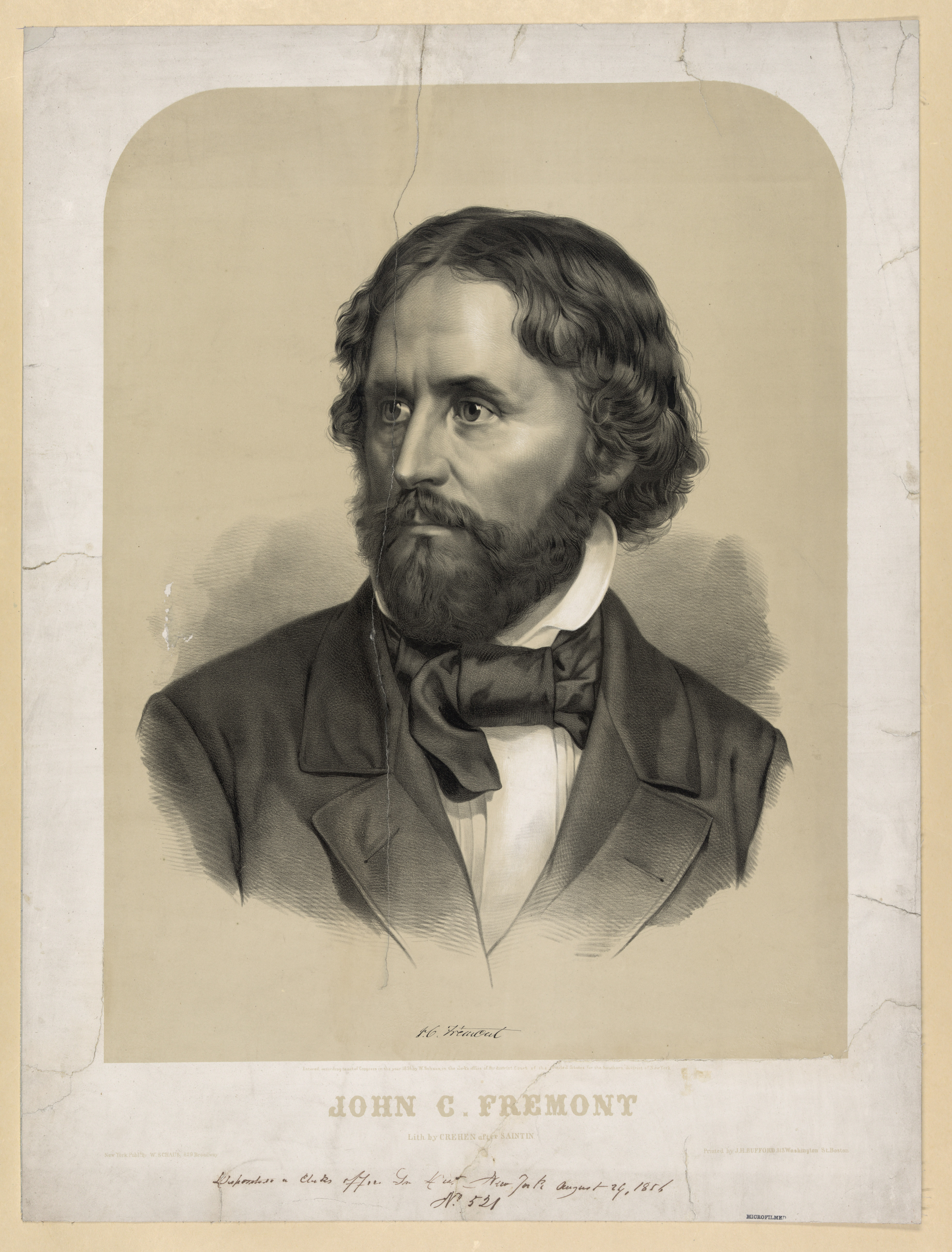
Portrait of John C. Frémont
