= Desiré-Raoul Rochette =

French archaeologist (1790–1854)

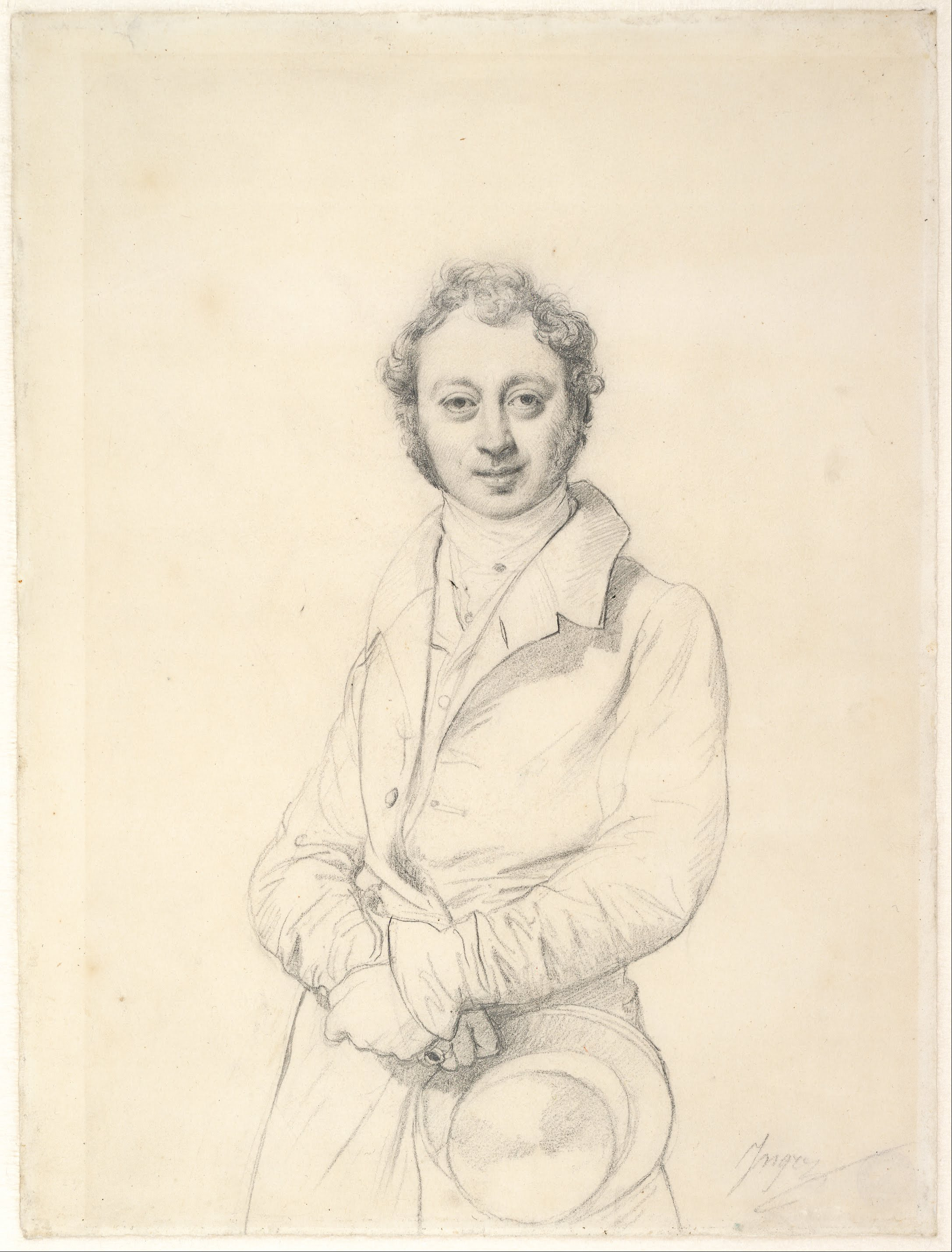
Portrait of Rochette by Ingres (c.1830)

Desiré-Raoul Rochette (March 6, 1790 – July 3, 1854), was a French archaeologist.

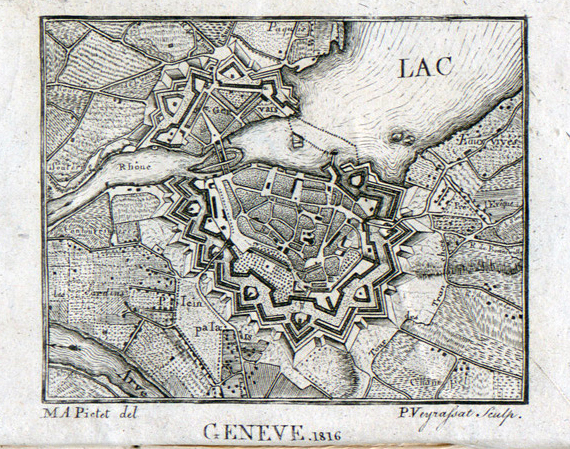
Map of Geneva, from Lettres sur la Suisse (1829)

== Life and work ==
Born at Saint-Amand in the department of Cher, he received his education at Bourges. In 1810, he obtained a chair of grammar in the Lycée Louis-le-Grand. He was named professor of history in the College of Louis-le-Grand at Paris in 1813 and in the Sorbonne in 1817. His first major work was Histoire critique de l'établissement des colonies grecques (4 vols., 1815).

He was superintendent of antiquities at the Bibliothèque nationale de France in Paris from 1819 to 1848, and professor of archaeology at the Bibliothèque from 1826, during which time he produced his Cours d'archéologie (1828). In 1829 he published Monuments inédits, with Peintures inédites following in 1836 and Peintures de Pompei in 1844. He contributed to the Annali of the Roman Institute, the Journal des Savants and the Académie des Inscriptions et Belles-Lettres.

He was elected a member of the American Antiquarian Society in 1838. At his death on 3 July 1854 Rochette was perpetual secretary of the Academy of Fine Arts and a corresponding member of most of the learned societies in Europe.
