= Musée mexicain =

Section of the Louvre

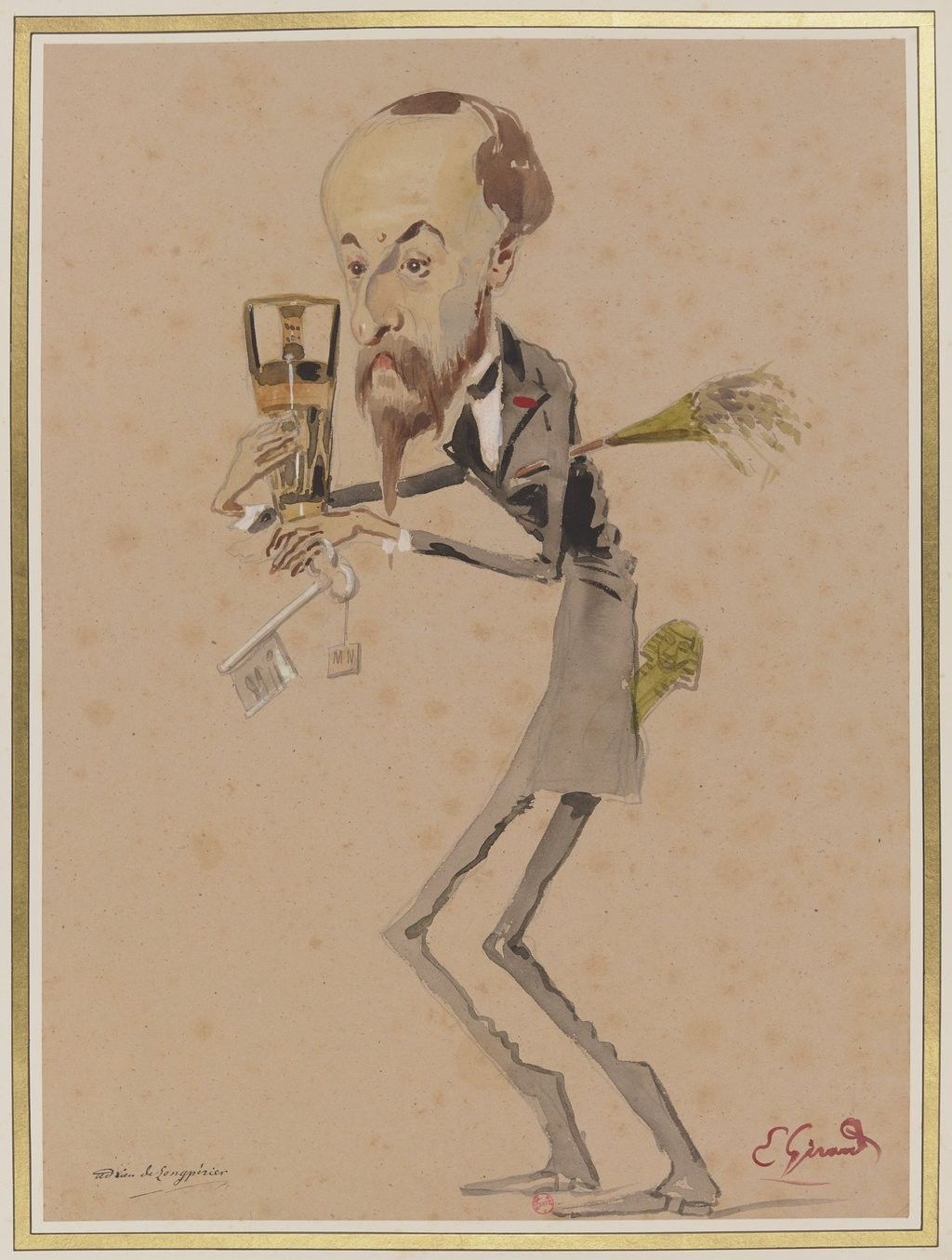
Second Empire cartoon of Adrien de Longpérier, founder of the Louvre's musée mexicain

The musée mexicain, later musée américain (Mexican Museum / American Museum), was a section of the Louvre that was dedicated to pre-Columbian art, with an initial emphasis on Mexican archaeology. It opened in 1850, and closed in 1887 when its collections were transferred to the Musée d'Ethnographie du Trocadéro.

== History ==
In the early 19th century, the archaeology of pre-Columbian Mexico emerged gradually alongside the more longstanding and prominent disciplines of classical archaeology, egyptology, and assyriology. The publication in Paris of Alexander von Humboldt's Vues des cordillères et monuments des peuples indigènes de l'Amerique in 1810 had a seminal impact, and was followed by other influential works by Carlos María de Bustamante, Henri Baradère, Edward King, Viscount Kingsborough, and Henri Ternaux-Compans.

The musée mexicain was the brainchild of Louvre antiquities curator Adrien Prévost de Longpérier. His first 1850 catalogue of 657 conserved artefacts, titled "Notice des Monuments exposés dans la salle des Antiquités américaines (Mexique, Pérou, Chili, Haïti, Antilles) au Musée du Louvre" has been described as "the first America-focused [European] museum monography" and "one of the first truly scientific compendiums in the field". In 1851, the section was renamed musée américain to account for the diversity of geographical origins of its collections. Its location, initially in a ground-floor room near the center of the North Wing of the Cour Carrée, was changed several times during its relatively brief existence.

Upon its opening it became a highly popular section of the Louvre. Following the removal of its collections from the Louvre in 1887, however, the memory of Longpérier's pioneering pre-Columbian art display gradually faded away to a point of near-oblivion.

== See also ==
- Musée des Souverains
