= Eugène Giraud =

French nineteenth-century painter

- Giraud in 1865
- Born: Pierre François Eugène Giraud; August 8, 1806
- Died: December 28, 1881 (aged 75)
- Known for: Painting, drawing

Pierre François Eugène Giraud (August 8, 1806 – December 28, 1881) was a French painter and engraver. In 1867 he painted one of the best known portraits of writer Gustave Flaubert, now housed at the Palace of Versailles. He also completed a pastel portrait of his friend, Alexandre Dumas, at the height of the novelist's career in 1845. He won many awards and honors in recognition for his work. He was made a Chevalier of the Legion of Honour in 1851 and was promoted to Officer in 1866.

== Notable works ==
- Danse dans une Posada à Granada, (1852)
- Jeunette dansant au Caire, (1866) et, (1869)
- Matador mortellement blessé
- Femmes d'Alger
- Caricature of Jules-Émile Saintin, between 1865 and 1870, watercolor (BnF)
- Le Départ de l'armée de Condé ?, (1873),
- Le Présentateur de bijou au harem, (1874),
- Le Libraire, (1875),
- Le Marché aux fleurs sous le Directoire, (1876).

== Gallery ==
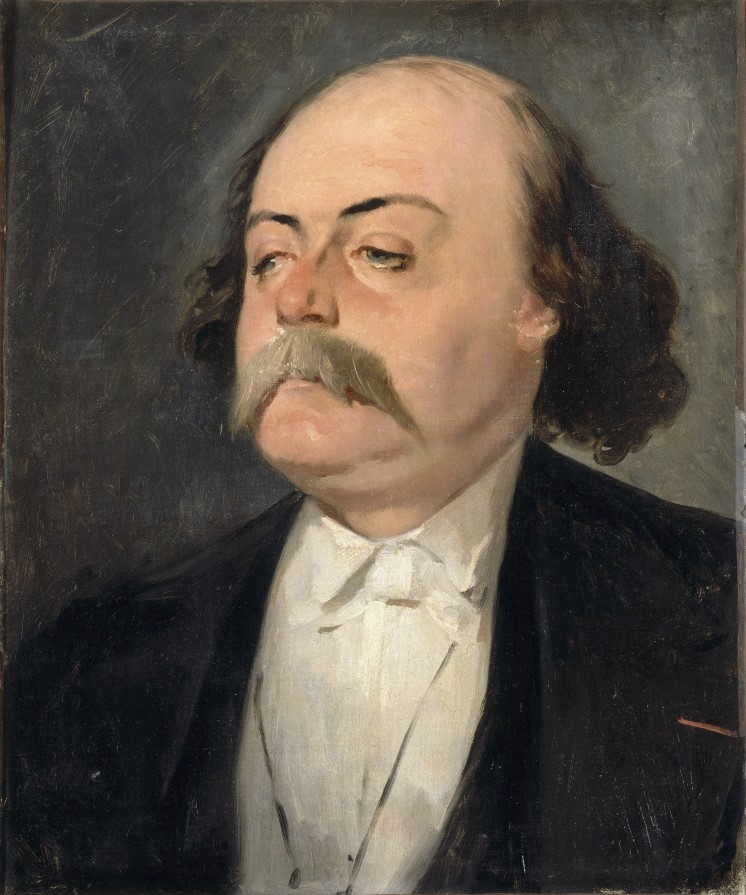
Portrait of Gustave Flaubert

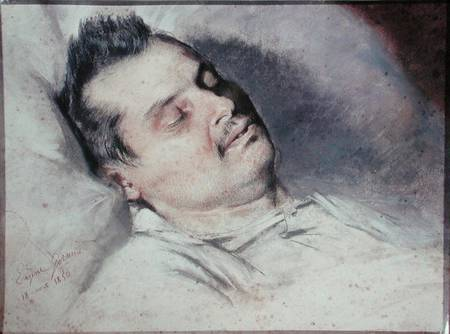
Death portrait of Balzac

Caricature of Jules-Émile Saintin

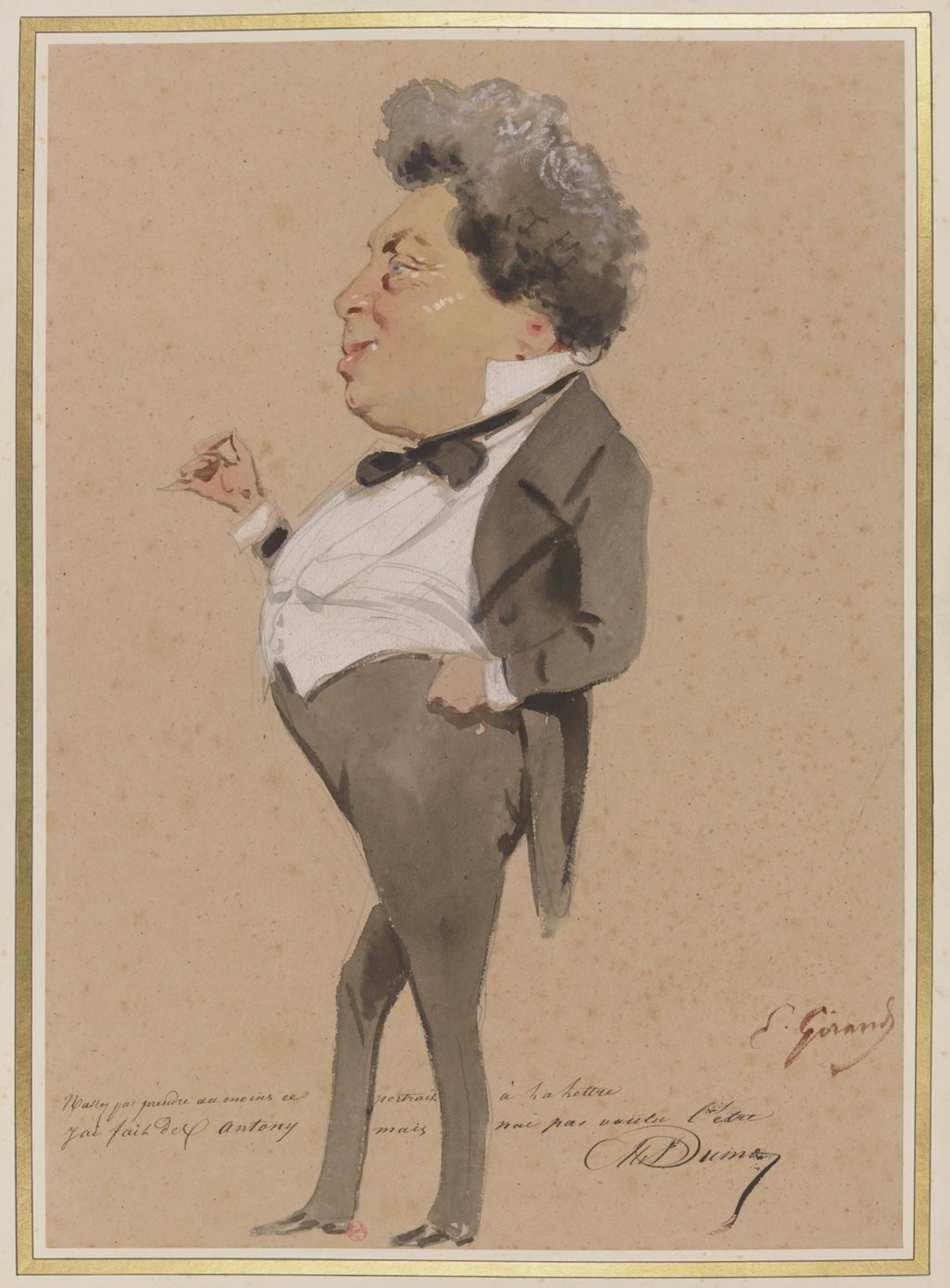
Caricature of Alexandre Dumas

Caricature of Charles Garnier
