= Lemé =

- Commune
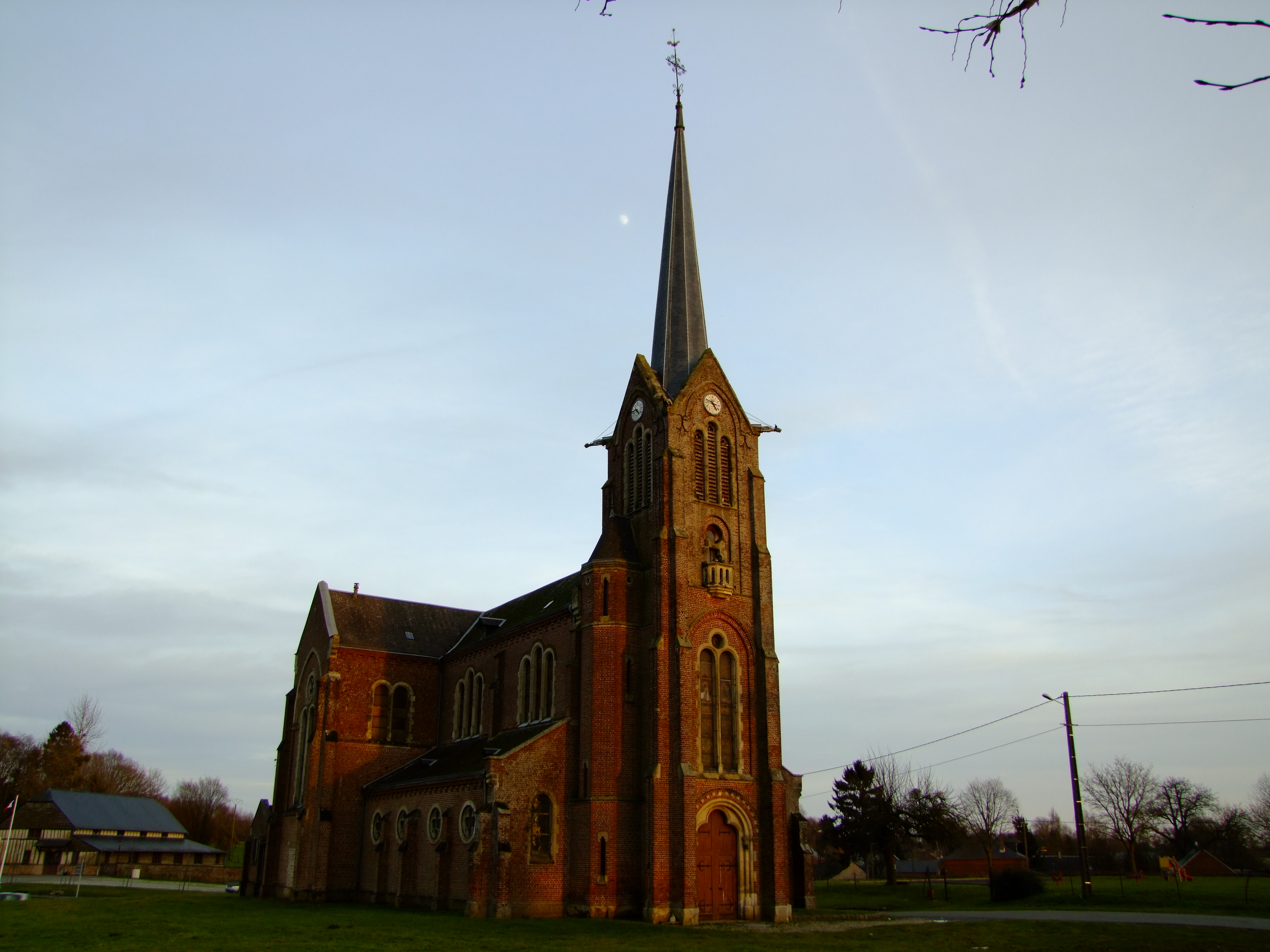
- The church of Lemé

- Coat of arms
- Location of Lemé
- Location within France Location within Hauts-de-France
- Coordinates: 49°50′18″N 3°45′53″E
- Country: France
- Region: Hauts-de-France
- Department: Aisne
- Arrondissement: Vervins
- Canton: Marle
- Intercommunality: Thiérache du Centre

Government
  - Mayor (2026–32): Christophe Blandin
- Area^{1}: 11.36 km^{2} (4.39 sq mi)
- Elevation: 164 m (538 ft)
- Highest elevation: 183 m (600 ft)
- Lowest elevation: 138 m (453 ft)
- Population (2023): 409
  - Density: 36.0/km^{2} (93.2/sq mi)
- Time zone: UTC+01:00 (CET)
  - Summer (DST): UTC+02:00 (CEST)
- INSEE/Postal code: 02416 /02140
- ^{1} French Land Register data, which excludes lakes, ponds, glaciers > 1 km^{2} (0.386 sq mi or 247 acres) and river estuaries.

Lemé (French pronunciation: [ləme]; Picard: Élmé) is a commune in the Aisne department in Hauts-de-France in northern France.

== Population ==
Historical population
| Year | Pop. | ±% p.a. |
|---|---|---|
| 1968 | 629 | — |
| 1975 | 444 | −4.85% |
| 1982 | 436 | −0.26% |
| 1990 | 478 | +1.16% |
| 1999 | 474 | −0.09% |
| 2007 | 450 | −0.65% |
| 2012 | 443 | −0.31% |
| 2017 | 430 | −0.59% |
| 2023 | 409 | −0.83% |
Source: INSEE

== See also ==
- Communes of the Aisne department
