= Jean de Witte =

Belgian archeologist, epigraphist and numismatist

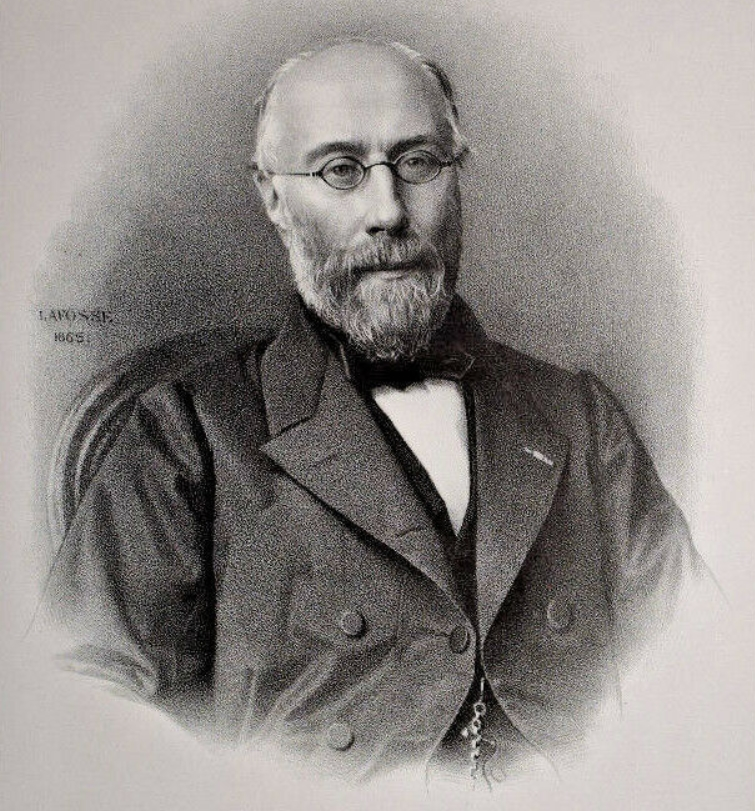
Jean de Witte

Baron Jean Joseph Antoine Marie de Witte (24 February 1808, Antwerp – 29 July 1889, Paris) was a Belgian archeologist, epigraphist and numismatist.

He collaborated with François Lenormant in founding the Gazette archéologique at the Bibliothèque nationale de France.
