= Berenice III =

Ptolemaic Queen of Egypt

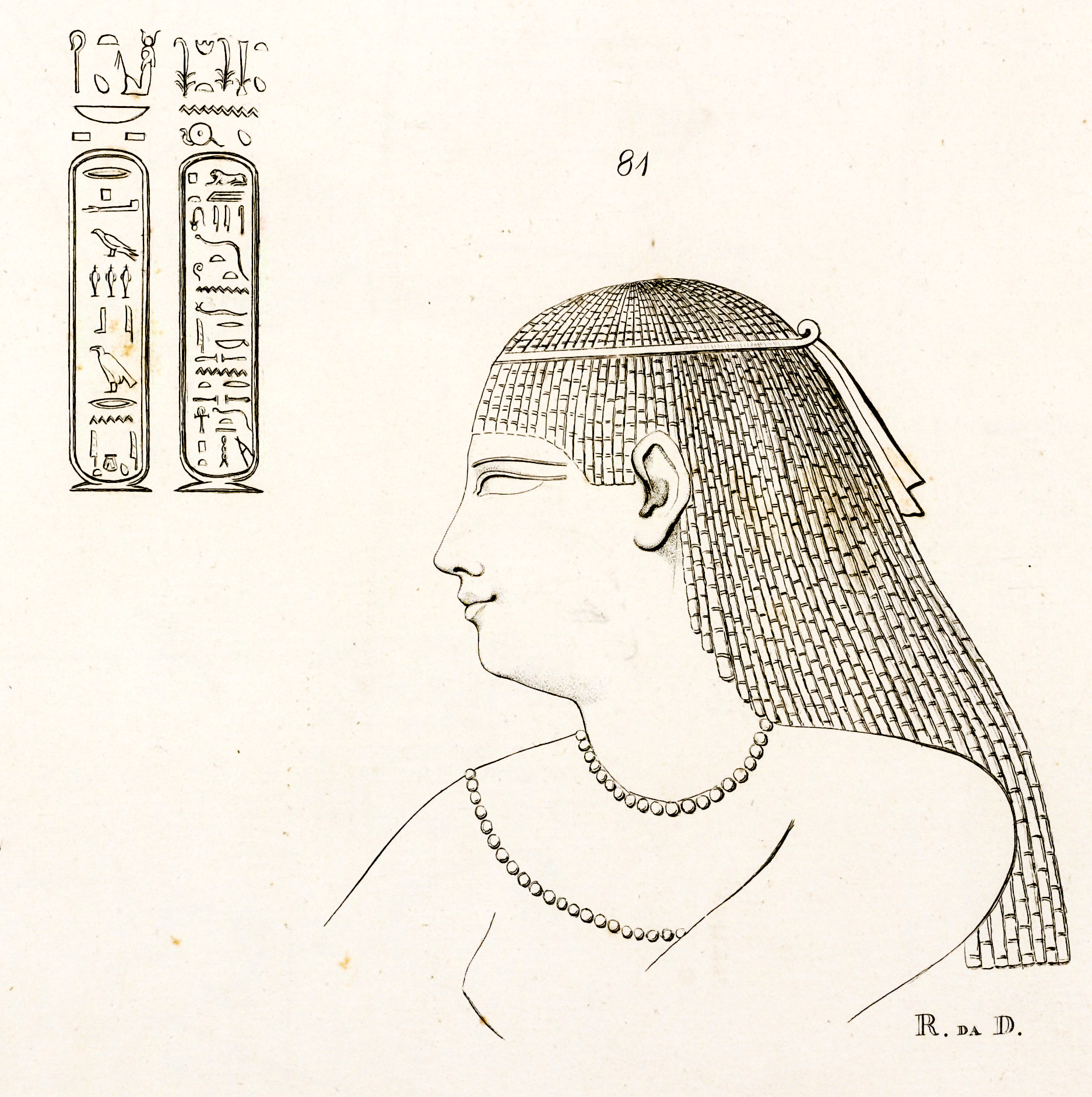

Pharaoh and Queen of the Ptolemaic Kingdom
- Reign: 101–88 BC; 81–80 BC
- Coregency: Ptolemy X Alexander I (101-88 BC); Ptolemy IX Lathyros (81 BC)
- Predecessor: Cleopatra III and Ptolemy X Alexander I (1st reign); Ptolemy IX (2nd reign)
- Successor: Ptolemy IX (1st reign); Ptolemy XI Alexander II (2nd reign)
Royal titulary
Nomen
jry-pꜤtt wr(t)-ḥsw(t) bjrnjkt
Irypatet Wer(et)hesu(t) Birniket
The hereditary princess who is great of praise, Bereniceq rw i wA p A d r t A H8 b i rw n i i W11 A t H8
- Consorts: Ptolemy X Ptolemy XI Alexander II
- Children: Cleopatra V of Egypt (possibly)
- Father: Ptolemy IX Soter
- Mother: Cleopatra Selene
- Born: 115/114 BC
- Died: April 80 BC (aged 34–35); Alexandria, Egypt
- Dynasty: Ptolemaic

Berenice III (Greek: Βερενίκη; 120–80 BC), also known as Cleopatra, ruled between 101 and 80 BC. Modern scholars studying Berenice III refer to her sometimes as Cleopatra Berenice. She was co-ruling queen of Ptolemaic Egypt with her uncle/husband Ptolemy X Alexander I, from 101 to 88 BC and again in 81 BC with her father Ptolemy IX Soter, before reigning as sole monarch of Egypt from 81 to 80 BC.

== Background and early life ==
Berenice's father was Ptolemy IX Soter, who became king of Egypt in 116 BC, with his mother Cleopatra III as his co-regent and the dominant force in government. He was initially married to his sister Cleopatra IV, but his mother forced him to divorce her and marry another sister, Cleopatra Selene, probably in early 115 BC. It is not certain which of these wives was Berenice's mother. Cleopatra Selene has been favored by some modern scholarship.

Historian Christopher Bennett notes that Berenice III's legitimacy was never questioned by ancient historians, unlike her brothers, Ptolemy XII and Ptolemy of Cyprus, and that Ptolemy IX's marriage to Cleopatra IV seems to have been considered illegitimate—making it more probable that Berenice III was the result of the legitimate marriage to Cleopatra Selene. In this case, she was probably born in late 115 or early 114 BC.

Ptolemy IX and Cleopatra III eventually came into conflict with one another. In 107 BC, Cleopatra whipped up the Alexandrian mob against Ptolemy IX, causing him to flee to Cyprus, abandoning Berenice and her brothers in Alexandria in the process. Cleopatra then installed Ptolemy IX's younger brother Ptolemy X Alexander on the throne, as a more pliant co-regent.

Ptolemy X married Berenice's probable mother Cleopatra Selene and thus became step-father to the seven-year-old Berenice. They probably had a son together, the future Ptolemy XI, but around 103 BC Cleopatra III forced them to divorce so that Cleopatra Selene could be married to the Seleucid king Antiochus VIII.

== First reign (101–88 BC) ==
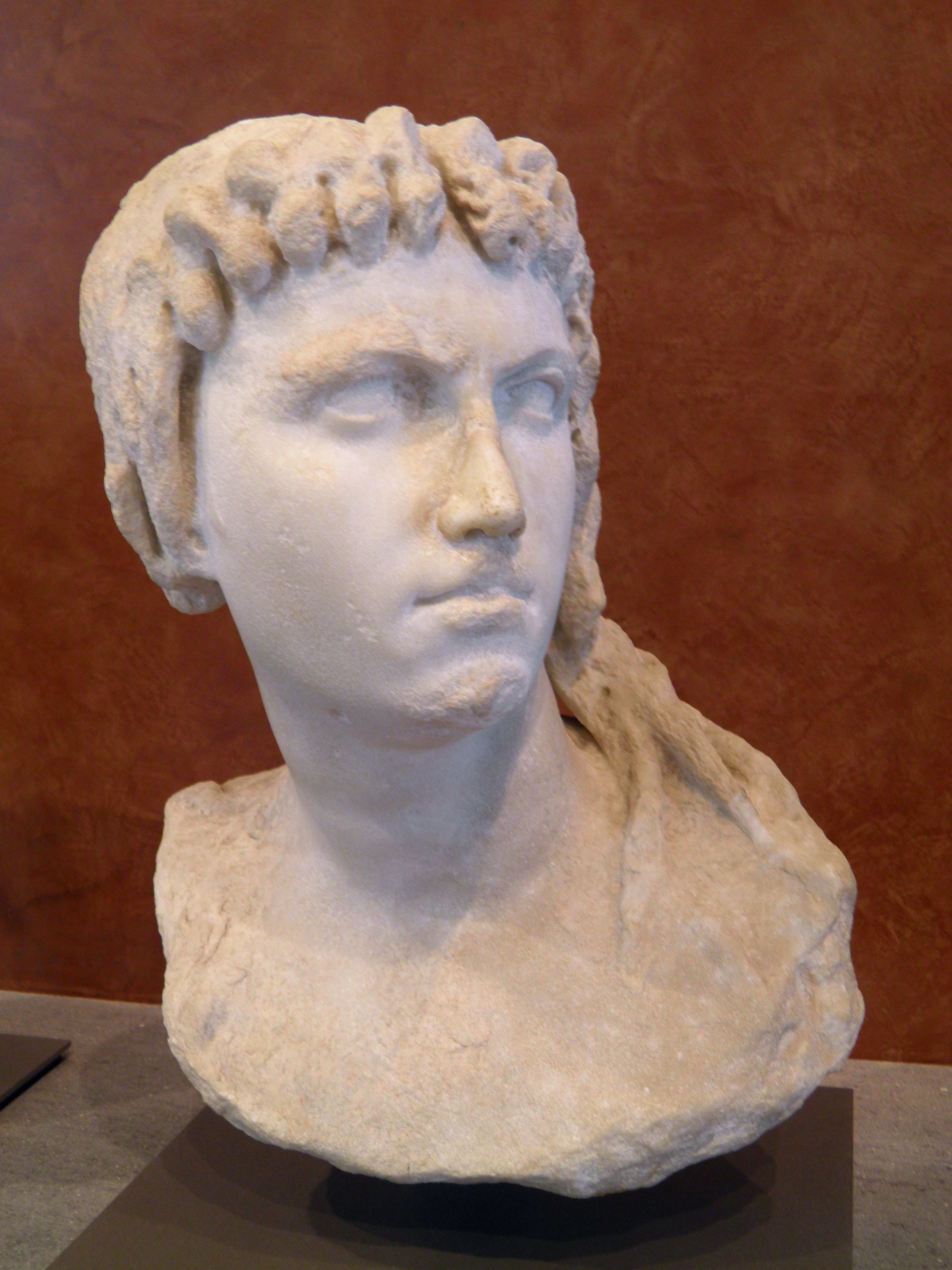
Head of a statuette depicting a Ptolemaic queen as the goddess Isis, possibly Berenice III; Louvre Museum, Paris.

In 101 BC, Ptolemy X had Cleopatra III murdered. Shortly after that, he married the thirteen-year-old Berenice and elevated her to the role of co-regent. The pair were joined together in the dynastic cult as the Theoi Philadelphoi (Sibling-loving Gods).

In 91 BC, a rebellion broke out in Upper Egypt. This rebellion was the latest in a series of native Egyptian uprisings in the region, following those of Hugronaphor (205–185 BC) and Harsiesi (131–130 BC). It is unknown what the name of the rebellion's leader was or whether he claimed the title of Pharaoh, as earlier rebel leaders had. The rebels gained control of Thebes and were supported by the Theban priests. Their forces are also attested in Latopolis and Pathyris. The rebellion also meant that the Ptolemies lost contact with the Triacontaschoenus region (Lower Nubia). Meroe took control of the region and retained it until the Roman period.

Around May 88 BC, the Alexandrians and the army turned against Ptolemy X and expelled him. The Alexandrians then invited Ptolemy IX to return to Alexandria and retake the throne, which he did. Berenice accompanied her husband into exile. The pair gathered a naval force to recapture the kingdom, but were defeated in battle. Ptolemy X recruited a second force at Myra, invaded Cyprus, and was killed.

Berenice returned to Egypt at some point after Ptolemy X's death and before 81 BC, but the exact date is not known.

== Second reign (81–80 BC) ==
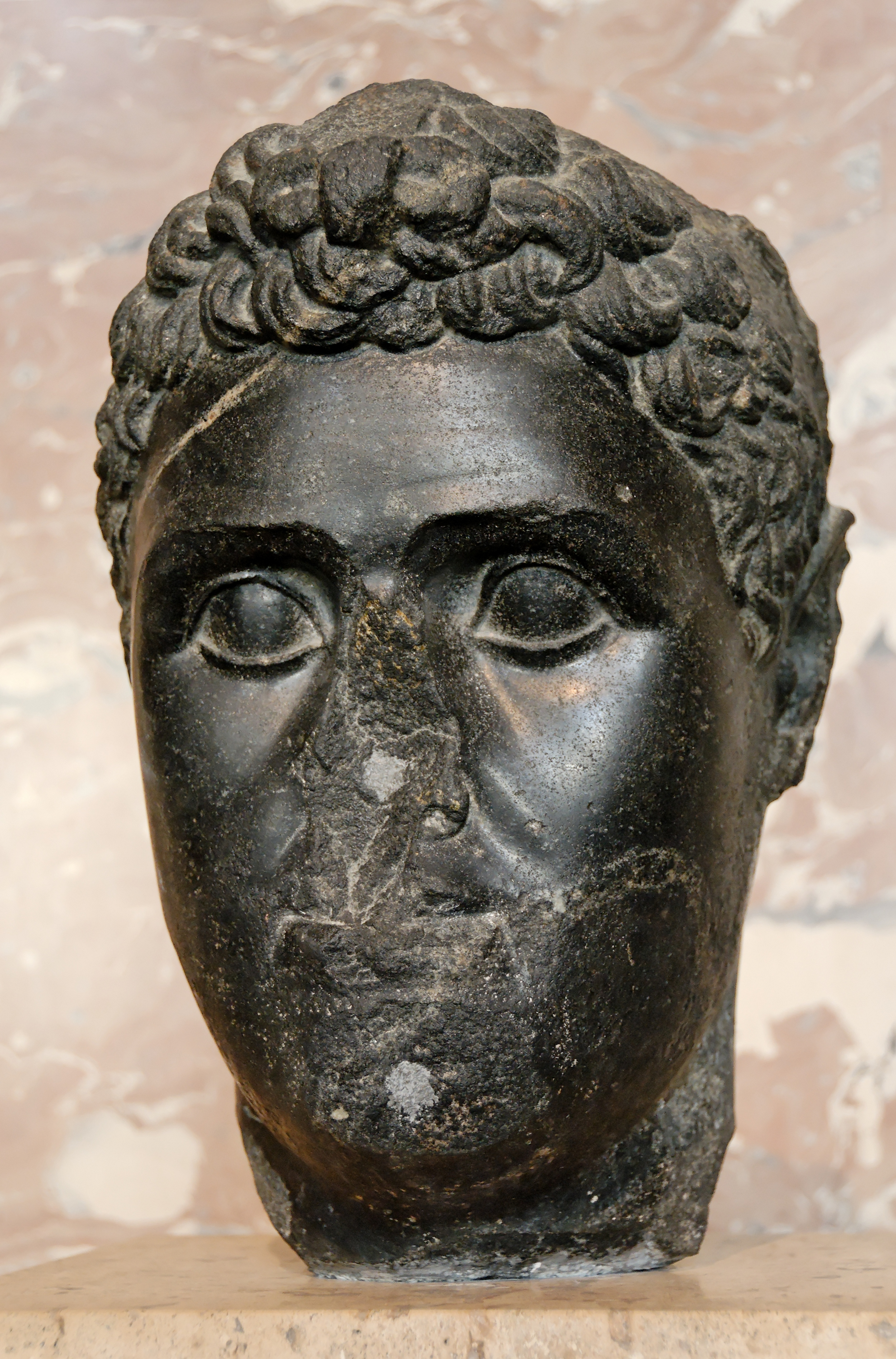
Basalt bust of Ptolemy X Alexander

On 5 August 81 BC, Ptolemy IX promoted his daughter Berenice III, who had previously been the wife and co-regent of Ptolemy X, to the status of co-regent. Some sources claim that Ptolemy IX had made Berenice III his co-regent at the start of his second reign in 88 BC, but all documentary evidence shows that he reigned alone until this point. Ptolemy died shortly thereafter, probably in December of the same year, leaving Berenice alone on the throne. At this point she was reincorporated into the dynastic cult as the Thea Philopator (Father-loving God), a clear reference to her inheritance of power from her father.

After a few months of sole rule, Berenice summoned her younger half-brother and former step-son, Ptolemy XI, from Rome to serve as co-regent. According to Appian, this co-regency was established at the behest of the Roman dictator Sulla, who hoped that Ptolemy XI would serve as a pliant client king. Ptolemy XI was crowned king on 3 April 80 BC. He murdered Berenice nineteen days later. Berenice's death angered the Alexandrians, and in response to her murder the people rioted on 22 April 80 BC. He was cornered in the gymnasium and killed. The throne then passed to Ptolemy XII Auletes, who was an illegitimate son of Ptolemy IX and the half-brother of Berenice.

== Legacy ==
Berenice is the subject of Berenice, an opera by Handel.

== Bibliography ==
- Bennett, Christopher J. (1997). "Cleopatra V Tryphæna and the Genealogy of the Later Ptolemies". Ancient Society. 28. Peeters Publishers: 39–66. doi:10.2143/AS.28.0.630068. ISSN 0066-1619.
- Hölbl, Günther (2001). A History of the Ptolemaic Empire. London & New York: Routledge. ISBN 0415201454.

Berenice III Ptolemaic dynasty Born: ca. 115 – 114 BC Died: 80 BC
Regnal titles
Preceded by Ptolemy X and Cleopatra III	Queen of Egypt; 101 BC–88 BC with Ptolemy X	Succeeded by Ptolemy IX
Preceded by Ptolemy IX	Queen of Egypt; 81 BC–80 BC with Ptolemy XI	Succeeded by Ptolemy XI
