= Ptolemy of Cyprus =

Last king of Cyprus, Ptolemaic dynasty

Ptolemy

King of Cyprus
- Reign: 80–58 BC
- Died: 58 BC; Cyprus
- Greek: Πτολεμαίος της Κύπρου
- House: Ptolemaic dynasty
- Father: Ptolemy IX Lathyros
- Mother: Cleopatra IV (disputed)

Ptolemy of Cyprus was the king of Cyprus c. 80 BC – 58 BC. He was the younger brother of Ptolemy XII Auletes, king of Egypt, and, like him, a son of Ptolemy IX Lathyros. He was also the uncle of Cleopatra VII.

== Life ==
Around the time of the theorized birth date of Ptolemy, his father Ptolemy IX was married to his sister-wife Cleopatra Selene, which makes her the plausible mother for Ptolemy, but the exact identity of the mother of Ptolemy and of his brother Ptolemy XII remains disputed.

The two brothers might have been the two children abandoned in 107 BC by Ptolemy IX on his escape from Alexandria, after their paternal grand-mother Cleopatra III had accused Ptolemy VII of attempting to assassinate her.

In 103 BC, due to impending invasion of Egypt by Ptolemy X, Cleopatra III sent Ptolemy and his brother to the Asclepieion on the island of Kos.

The brothers were taken captive by Mithridates VI Eupator in 88 BC and brought back to his court as hostages. Some years after their capture, the two were betrothed to two of Mithridates's daughters, Mithridatis and Nyssa.

However in 63 BC during the annexation of Pontus by Pompey on behalf of Rome, Mithridates and his two daughters committed suicide by poison rather than being executed or being brought to Rome to be paraded in a triumphal procession.

== Reign over Cyprus ==
He appears to have been acknowledged king of Cyprus at the same time his brother Auletes obtained possession of the throne of Egypt, 80 BC. He neglected the precaution of obtaining confirmation of his sovereignty at Rome, and made the additional error of offending Publius Clodius Pulcher, by failing to ransom him when he had fallen into the hands of Cilician pirates.

When Clodius became tribune in 58 BC, he enacted a law to deprive Ptolemy of his kingdom, and reduce Cyprus to a Roman province. Cato, who was entrusted with carrying out this decree, advised Ptolemy to submit, offering him his personal safety, with the office of high priest of the Sanctuary of Aphrodite Paphia in Palaeaphos and a generous pension. Ptolemy refused, and, wholly unprepared to resist Roman power and deciding to die a king, killed himself.

== See also ==
- Cleopatra
- Ptolemaic kingdom
