= Cleopatra IV =

Queen consort of Egypt from 116-115 BC

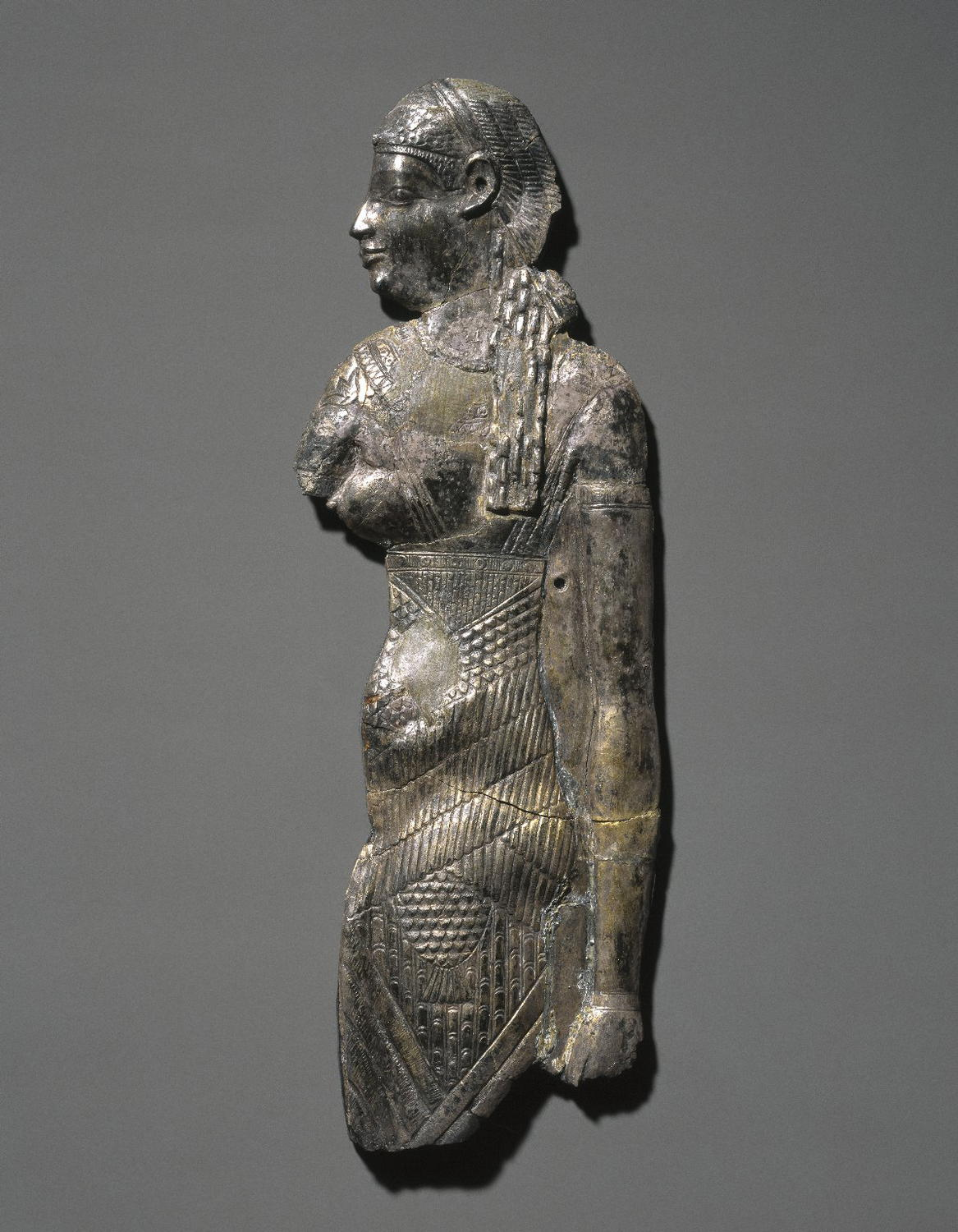
- Plaque possibly depicting Cleopatra IV

Queen consort of Egypt
- Tenure: 116–115 BC
- Coronation: 116 BC
- Predecessor: Nominal co-rulers Cleopatra II and Cleopatra III as ruling King's wives
- Successor: Cleopatra Selene I

Seleucid Queen
- Tenure: 114–112 BC (in opposition to queen consort Tryphaena)
- Coronation: 114 BC
- Born: c. 138 – 135 BC
- Died: 112 BC (aged 22–26)
- Spouse: Ptolemy IX (c. 119/118 BC–c. 115 BC); Antiochus IX (married c. 115–112 BC)
- Issue: Ptolemy XII (possibly); Ptolemy of Cyprus (possibly); Antiochus X (possibly); Cleopatra V (possibly)
- Dynasty: Ptolemaic
- Father: Ptolemy VIII Physcon
- Mother: Cleopatra III of Egypt

Cleopatra IV (Ancient Greek: Κλεοπάτρα) was Queen of Egypt briefly from 116 to 115 BC, as first wife of Ptolemy IX Lathyros. She later became queen consort of the Seleucid king of Syria as the wife of Antiochus IX Cyzicenus.

== Biography ==
=== Queen of Egypt ===
Cleopatra IV was the daughter of Ptolemy VIII Physcon and Cleopatra III of Egypt. She was born between 138 and 135 BC. She was the sister of Ptolemy IX, Ptolemy X, Cleopatra Selene I and Tryphaena.

Cleopatra IV married her brother Ptolemy IX when he was still a prince in c. 119/118 BC. Cleopatra IV may be the mother of Ptolemy XII Auletes and Ptolemy of Cyprus, although an unnamed concubine could be the mother of these two men as well.

In c. 115 BC Cleopatra III forced Cleopatra IV and Ptolemy IX to divorce. She replaced Cleopatra IV with her sister Cleopatra Selene.

According to Tara Sewell-Lasater, because Cleopatra III held on to power so actively, it does seem she did not allow her daughters, Cleopatra IV and Cleopatra Selene I, to be formal co-rulers like herself, and restricted them to the position of consorts.

Cleopatra IV was posthumously added to the list of deified Ptolemies as the Thea Philadelphos (= "brother-loving goddess").

=== Queen of Syria and death ===
After her forced divorce, Cleopatra IV fled Egypt and went to Cyprus, where she married Antiochus IX Cyzicenus and brought him the army of his half brother Seleucid King Antiochus VIII Grypus of Syria, which she had convinced to follow her. Grypus fought Cyzicenus and eventually chased him to Antioch. Grypus was married to Cleopatra IV's sister Tryphaena. Tryphaena decided that Cleopatra IV should die and over the protests of her husband summoned some soldiers and had Cleopatra IV murdered in the sanctuary of Daphne in Antioch.

In his comprehensive website about Ptolemaic genealogy, Christopher Bennett also notes the possibility that Cleopatra IV, from her brief marriage to Antiochus IX Cyzicenus, may have been the mother of the later Seleucid monarch, Antiochus X Eusebes ("the Pious"). Antiochus X would go on to marry Cleopatra IV's younger sister, Cleopatra Selene, thus making him the spouse of a woman who was his stepmother (Selene married both of her sisters' widowers, Grypus and Cyzicenus, before marrying Eusebes) and perhaps his maternal aunt.

== See also ==
- List of Syrian monarchs
- Timeline of Syrian history

Cleopatra IV Ptolemaic dynasty Born: c. 138 – 135 BC Died: 112 BC
Royal titles
Preceded by Cleopatra II and Cleopatra III (as co-ruling royal wives)	Queen consort of Egypt; 116–115 BC	Succeeded by Cleopatra Selene I
Preceded by Tryphaena	Seleucid Queen (Queen Consort of Syria); 114–112 BC with Tryphaena	Succeeded by Tryphaena
