= Ptolemy IX Soter =

2nd/1st century BC king of Ptolemaic Egypt

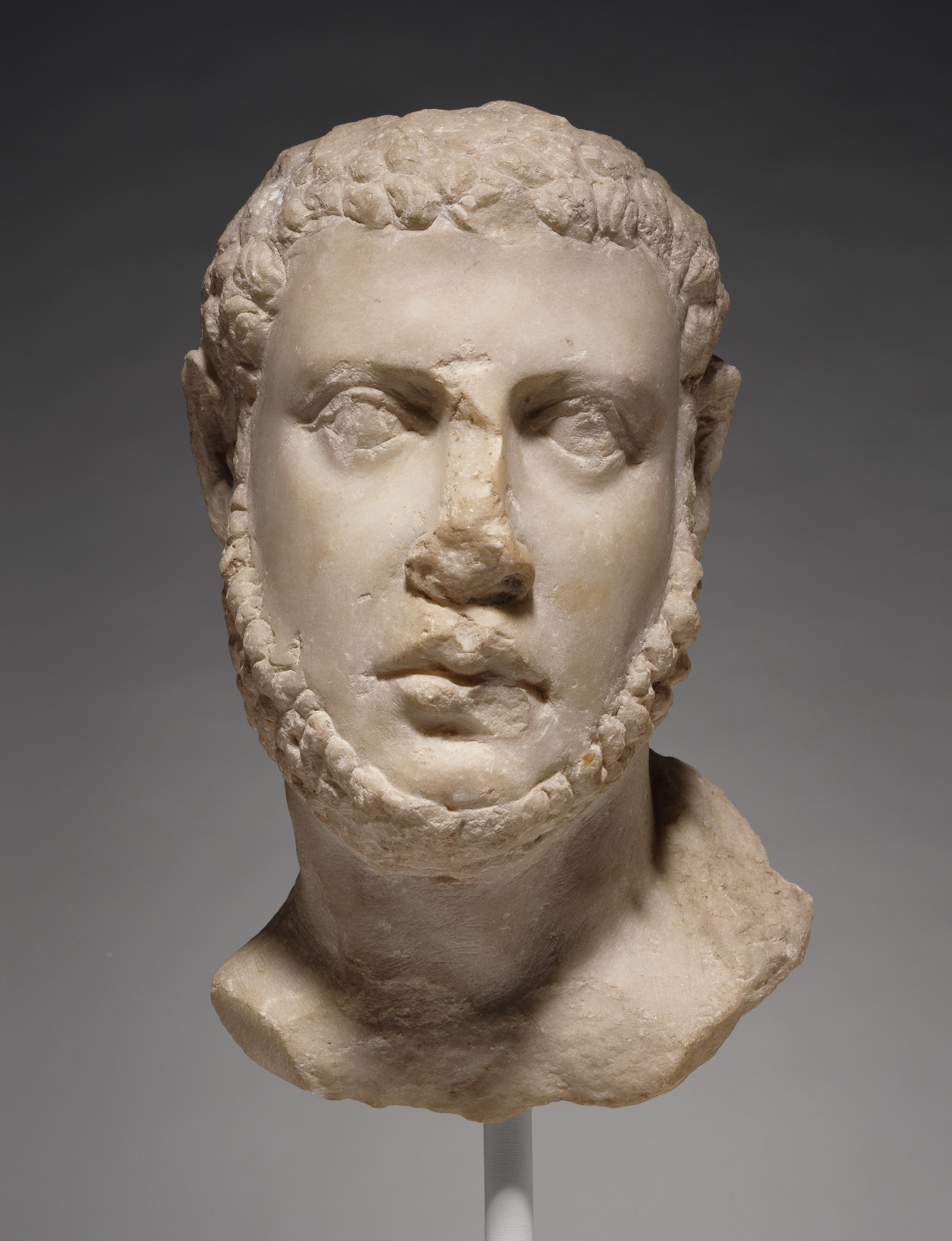
- Probable bust of Ptolemy IX (or X)

Pharaoh and King of the Ptolemaic Kingdom
- Reign: 116–107 BC with Cleopatra III; 88–81 BC
- Predecessor: Ptolemy VIII and Cleopatra III (116 BC); Ptolemy X Alexander I (88 BC)
- Successor: Ptolemy X Alexander I (107 BC); Berenice III (81 BC)
Royal titulary
Horus name
ḏsr-mswt-ḥnꜤ-ḥpw-Ꜥnḫ nṯrj-ḫpr(w) snsn-msḫn(t)-nt-zꜢ-Ꜣst
Djosermesuthenahapuankh netjerikheperu sensenmesekhenetsa'Aset
Distinguished through his birth together with the living Apis, godlike at conception, twin in his birthplace with the son of Isis
G5	G6 r ms s Z3 D21 V28 Aa5 p zA anx E1 xpr r A26 A26 ms s x nw N37 nw t zA Z1 Q1 t B9
Second Horus Name:
kꜢ-nḫt jty-psḏ-m-tꜢmrj-mj-ḥpw-Ꜥnḫ rdj-n.f-ḥꜢbw-sd-ꜤšꜢw-wrw-mj-ptḥ-tꜢṯnn-jt-nṯrw
Kanakht itypesedjemtamerimihapuankh redjenefhabusedashauwerumiptah-tatjenenitnetjeru
The strong bull and sovereign who shines in Ta-mery like the living Apis bull, whom has been given many Sed festivals like Ptah Ta-tjenen, and father of the gods
G5	E1 Z9 D40 mi i U33 i i A22 DdN8 N17 t O5 O49 anx E1 mi r t a n f O23 Z2 I1 Z2 wr Z2 mi p Z1 H C18 t f Z1 f G5 Z3
Nebty name
sḫꜤi-sw-mwt.f-ḥr-nst-jt.f jṯj-tꜢwj m mꜢꜤ-ḫrw
Sekhasumutefhernesutitef ititawy em Maat-kheru
G16
s xa a Y1 sw w t G14 f D2 Z1 g pr t f Z1 f V15 f M12 wADSw P8
Second Nebty name:
wr-pḥti ḫnti-š-nḥḥ smn-hpw-mi-ḏḥwti-ꜤꜢ-ꜤꜢ
Werpehty Khentishenehe Semenhepumidjehutia'a
G16	wr r F9 F9 Z9 D40 W17 N37 N36 H ra H s U32 h p H6 Z2 mi G26 O29 O29
Third Nebty name:
wr-pḥti sḫm-WꜢḏ-wr iti-iwꜤ-tꜢwi-m-mꜢꜤ-ḫrw mnḫ-ib-ḫr-nṯrw-rmṯw
Werpehty Sekhemwadjwer Itiiwatawyemmaatkheru Menkhibkhernetjeruremetju
G16	wr r F9 F9 Z9 D40 Dsr M14 wr N36 V15 F44 xpr N21 xpr N21 Aa15 Sw P8 mnx ib Z1 N37 r G7 Z1
Golden Horus
nb-tꜢmri ḥḳꜢ.f-m-ḥꜤꜤw nb-ḥꜢbw-sd-mi-tꜢṯnn-it-nṯrw-nsyt(?) ity-smn-hpw-mi-ḏḥwti-ꜤꜢ-ꜤꜢ
Nebtamery Heqa'efemhaau Nebhabusedmitatenenitnetjerunesut Itysemenhepumidjehutia'a
Lord of Egypt who rules in joy, the lord of the Sed festival like Ptah-Tatenen, king of the Gods, who determines the laws like the great god Thoth
G8	nb N16 O5 O49 HqA A40 f Aa15 A28 D36 nb O23 Z3 C18 t f nTrw sw i i t Z3 A46 A23 D29 U32 h p Y1 Z2 G26 O29 O29 mi
Second Golden Horus name:
šzp-tꜢmri ḥḳꜢ.f-m-ḥꜤꜤw nb-ḥꜢbw-sd-ꜤšꜢw-wrw-mi-it.f-Ptḥ-tꜢṯnn-smsw-nṯrw šzp.n.f-nsyt-n-rꜤ-m-ḳnw-nḫt ity-wḏꜤ-MꜢꜤt smn-hpw-mi-ḏḥwti-ꜤꜢ-ꜤꜢ
Sheseptamery Heqa'efemhaau Nebhabusedashauwerumiitefptatatenensemsunetjeru Shesepenefnesytenraemqenunekhet Itiwedjamaat Semenhepumidjehutia'a
Who, seizing Egypt, rules in joy, the lord of many great Sed festivals like his father Ptah-Tatenen, the oldest of the Gods
G8	O42 N17 M17 M17 M17 M17 Aa18 t O49 A40 A9 m A28 D36 nb I1 Z2 wr r Z3 mi t A9 A9 C19 C18 A23 G7 G7 G7 d n f A43 t Z2 S3 C2 m T16 nw A24
Prenomen
iwꜤ-(n)-nṯr-mnḫ-nṯrt-mr(t)-mwt.s-nḏt(t) stp.n-ptḥ iri-mꜢꜤt-rꜤ sḫm-Ꜥnḫ-imn
Iwa(en)netjermenekhnetjeretmeretmutesnedjet(et) Setepenptah Irimaatre Sekhemankhamun

M23 X1 L2 X1	mnx nTr t nTr D39 t H8 z N36 Aa27 t H8 F44 A41 sxm C12 C2 stp n ir Aa11

M23 X1 L2 X1	mnx nTr nTr D39 z N36 nw t Aa27 F44 n A40 sxm C12 C2 stp ir Aa11 n

M23 X1 L2 X1	mnx nTr F44 nTr t H8 t G14 s N36 Aa27 nw t D40 p t H stp n ir Aa11 C12 C1 sxm anx

M23 X1 L2 X1	mnx nTr mnx nTr F44 p t H stp n ir Aa11 n C2 C12 sxm anx
Nomen
ptwlmis Ꜥnḫ-ḏt mri-ptḥ
Petulemis Ankhdjet meryptah
Ptolemaios, living forever, beloved of Ptah

G39 N5	p t wA l M i i s anx D&t N17 p t H N36
- Consorts: Cleopatra IV of Egypt (m. 119 BC; divorced 115 BC); Cleopatra Selene (m. 115 BC; divorced 107 BC)
- Children: Two legitimate sons; Berenice III, Queen of Egypt; Ptolemy XII, King of Egypt; Ptolemy, King of Cyprus; Cleopatra V, Queen of Egypt (perhaps)
- Father: Ptolemy VIII of Egypt
- Mother: Cleopatra III of Egypt
- Born: 143/2 BC or 140/39 BC
- Died: December 81 BC
- Dynasty: Ptolemaic dynasty

Ptolemy IX Soter II (Note: Numbering the Ptolemies is a modern convention. Older sources may give a number one higher or lower. The most reliable way of determining which Ptolemy is being referred to in any given case is by epithet (e.g. "Philopator"). Ptolemy IX also took the same title 'Soter' as Ptolemy I. In older references and in more recent references by the German historian Huss, Ptolemy IX may be numbered VIII.) (Greek: Πτολεμαῖος Σωτήρ, Ptolemaĩos Sōtḗr 'Ptolemy the Saviour'), commonly nicknamed Lathyros (Λάθυρος, Láthuros 'chickpea'), was twice king of Ptolemaic Egypt. The son of Ptolemy VIII and Cleopatra III; he reigned as Ptolemy Philometor Soter in joint rule with his grandmother Cleopatra II and mother Cleopatra III from 116 to 107 BC, and then again as Ptolemy Soter from 88 to 81 BC. Ptolemy IX became the heir apparent after the murder of his half-brother Ptolemy Memphites in 130 BC, during a civil war between Ptolemy VIII and Cleopatra II. On his father's death in 116 BC, he became co-regent with Cleopatra II (until 115 BC) and with Cleopatra III. He eventually quarrelled with his mother and in 107 BC, she deposed him and replaced him with his younger brother, Ptolemy X. However, Ptolemy IX succeeded in seizing control of Cyprus. From there he invaded Judaea, but was prevented by Ptolemy X from invading Egypt (103–102 BC). In 88 BC, the Alexandrians expelled Ptolemy X and restored Ptolemy IX to the throne. He reigned alone until 81 BC, when he appointed his daughter Berenice III as co-regent shortly before his own death. She succeeded him as ruler.

== Background and early life ==
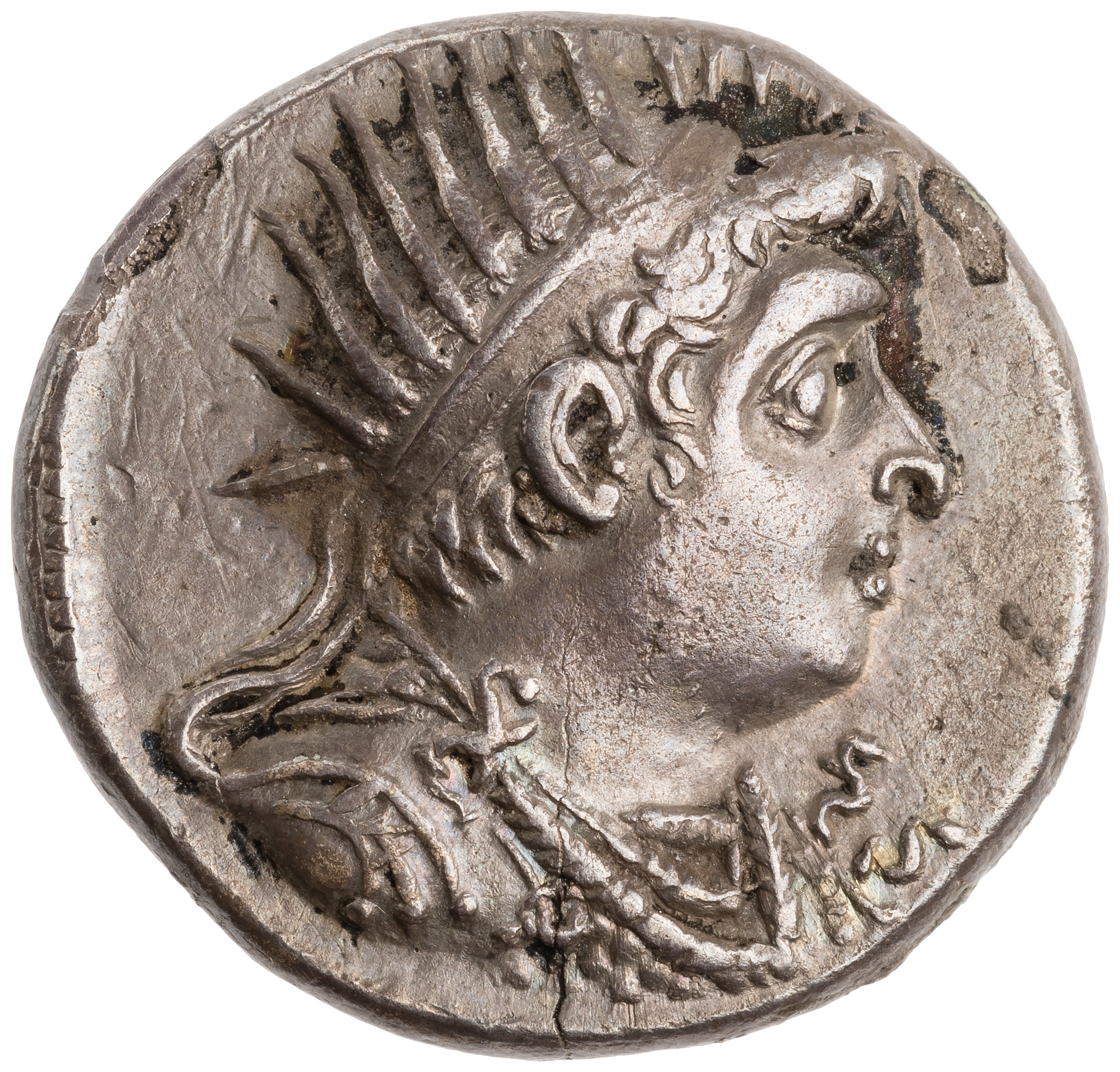
Coin of Ptolemy VIII

When the Ptolemaic king Ptolemy V died in 180 BC, he left three children: Ptolemy VI, Cleopatra II, and Ptolemy VIII. All three ruled together from 169 BC until 164 BC, when Ptolemy VIII expelled his brother from power. In 163 BC, he was expelled in turn and forced to withdraw to Cyrene. However, when Ptolemy VI died in 145 BC, Ptolemy VIII was invited back to Egypt to serve as king, marrying his sister Cleopatra II, also sister and widow of Ptolemy VI. The relationship between Ptolemy VIII and Cleopatra II rapidly deteriorated, especially when Ptolemy VIII took Cleopatra III, daughter of Ptolemy VI and Cleopatra II, as a second wife. The conflict eventually led to a civil war with Cleopatra II on one side and Ptolemy VIII and Cleopatra III on the other (132–126 BC). Ptolemy VIII and Cleopatra III were victorious, but reconciled with Cleopatra II and restored her as co-regent in 124 BC.

Ptolemy IX was the son of Ptolemy VIII and Cleopatra III. The exact date of his birth is a bit unclear. As pharaoh, his Horus name was "Distinguished through his birth together with the living Apis; twin in his birthplace with the son of Isis" which seems to indicate that he was born in the same year as an Apis bull, i.e. 143/142 BC. This would put his birth two years before his parents' marriage, which took place in 141 BC. Some historians, like Günther Hölbl, consider this insuperable and propose to place his birth in 140 or 139 BC instead.

Initially, Ptolemy IX was not the heir to the throne – that was Ptolemy Memphites, the son of Ptolemy VI and Cleopatra II, who was roughly the same age as him. In 134/133 BC, Ptolemy IX served as the annual priest of Alexander the Great, the year after Ptolemy Memphites had done the same. However, in 130 BC, during the civil war, Cleopatra II attempted to have Ptolemy Memphites crowned as her co-ruler, so Ptolemy VIII had him murdered, leaving Ptolemy IX as the heir.

Around 117 BC, Ptolemy IX was sent to Cyprus, reportedly at his mother's request, where he served as governor of the island (strategos, nauarchos, archiereus, archikynegos). Shortly before this he had married his sister Cleopatra IV, who probably gave birth to two sons while the couple was on Cyprus: the future Ptolemy XII in 117 BC and Ptolemy, future king of Cyprus, c. 116 BC.

== First reign (116–107 BC) ==
=== Will of Ptolemy VIII ===
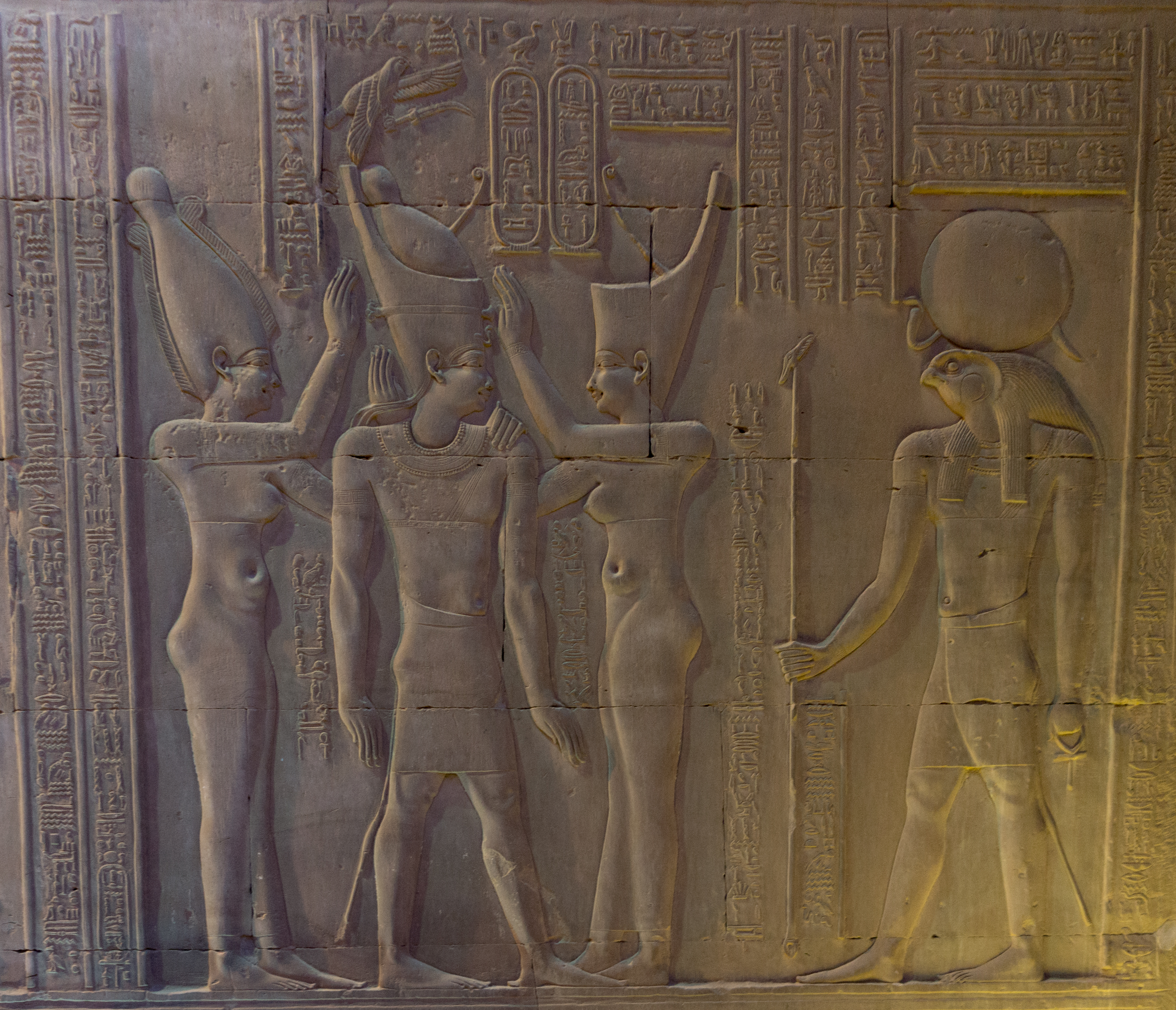
Coronation of Ptolemy IX depicted at Kom Ombo

On 28 June 116 BC, Ptolemy VIII died. According to Justin, Ptolemy VIII's will left Cleopatra III in charge of Egypt, with the right to choose either Ptolemy IX or his younger brother Ptolemy X as her co-regent. Cyrene was left to Ptolemy VIII's illegitimate son, Ptolemy Apion. Justin further claims that Cleopatra III wanted to choose Ptolemy X, but the people of Alexandria rioted and forced her to choose Ptolemy IX. Pausanias implies that Cleopatra III's request to send Ptolemy IX to Cyprus in 117 BC had been intended to get him out of the way to enable Ptolemy X's succession.

Some historians have found this account plausible. However, Chris Bennett argues that it is a false story that was invented by Cleopatra III at a later date. He points out that Justin's story assumes that Cleopatra III was the only living queen at the time of Ptolemy VIII's death. Documentary evidence shows that Cleopatra II was still alive in 116 BC, which makes it unlikely that Cleopatra III would have been allowed sole power to decide who would be king.

At any rate, Cleopatra II, Cleopatra III, and Ptolemy IX (in that order) are listed together as co-rulers in surviving papyrus documents from October 116 BC. Ptolemy IX received the epithet Philometor Soter (Mother-loving Saviour). This was the same epithet that Cleopatra II and taken on during her civil war with Ptolemy VIII and Cleopatra III, which suggests that she played a controlling role in the new regime. Ptolemy X was sent to Cyprus to serve as governor of Cyprus soon after Ptolemy IX's accession.

=== Divorce, remarriage, and intervention in Seleucid civil war ===
Cleopatra II died some time before April 115 BC and at this point Cleopatra III became the dominant force in government. Ptolemy IX was forced to divorce his sister-wife Cleopatra IV, who went off and married her cousin, the Seleucid king Antiochus IX (r. 115–95 BC), whose mother Cleopatra Thea was Cleopatra III's sister. Antiochus IX was waging a war against his half-brother Antiochus VIII (r. 125–96 BC), who was married to Cleopatra IV's elder sister Tryphaena. On the way to meet Antiochus IX, Cleopatra IV stopped in Cyprus, where she recruited an army and seized control of the Cypriot fleet, to aid Antiochus IX. Perhaps as a result of this, in 114/113 BC, Ptolemy X proclaimed himself 'King of Cyprus', openly declaring his opposition to Ptolemy IX.

Meanwhile, Ptolemy IX married his younger sister, Cleopatra Selene, with whom he soon had a daughter, Berenice III. Cleopatra Selene was not made co-regent with her new husband, as would have been normal. Instead, in documents from this period, the royal couple were Cleopatra III and Ptolemy IX, who were integrated into the Ptolemaic dynastic cult as the Theoi Philometores Soteres (The Mother-loving Saviour Gods).

Ptolemy IX supported Antiochus IX in his conflict with Antiochus VIII. In 114 BC, Cleopatra IV had been captured and murdered by Antiochus VIII's wife Tryphaena, who was murdered in turn by Antiochus IX in 111 BC. In 109 BC, Ptolemy IX sent Antiochus IX fresh troops to aid him in a campaign against the Jewish ruler John Hyrcanus of the Hasmonean dynasty.

=== Expulsion from Alexandria ===
In autumn 107 BC, a new conflict broke out between Cleopatra III and Ptolemy IX. Pausanias claims that Cleopatra III wounded a number of her own eunuch servants and displayed them to the people as evidence that her son had attempted to have her assassinated, causing the Alexandrians to riot and expel Ptolemy IX from the city. While this was taking place, Ptolemy X had left Cyprus and sailed to Pelusium. Cleopatra III then had him brought to Alexandria and placed on the throne as her new co-regent. Ptolemy IX had left his two sons behind when he fled Alexandria. He also abandoned Cleopatra Selene, who now seems to have been married to Ptolemy X.

== King of Cyprus (107–88 BC) ==
After his expulsion from Alexandria, Ptolemy IX went to Cyprus. There, forces loyal to Cleopatra III and Ptolemy X rebuffed him, forcing him to retreat to Seleucia in Pieria. From there he mounted another invasion of Cyprus in 106 BC, which succeeded in conquering the island. He initially maintained control of Cyrene, but it seems to have come under the control of his half brother Ptolemy Apion some time after 105 BC. Apion protected his position by publishing a will which left all his territories to Rome in the event that he died without heirs, a method which was often used by Hellenistic kings to prevent rivals from attempting to depose or assassinate them. However, he actually died without heirs in 96 BC, meaning that Rome inherited the territory.

In 103 BC, the new Hasmonean king Alexander Jannaeus led an army to conquer Ptolemais Akko. The city appealed to Ptolemy IX for help and he sailed over and caused Jannaeus to lift his siege. He then invaded Galilee, defeated Jannaeus in a battle at Asophon near the River Jordan, and despoiled Judaea with impunity. Fearing that Ptolemy IX was planning to use Judaea as a springboard for an invasion of Egypt, Cleopatra III and Ptolemy X invaded Judaea themselves. Ptolemy X invaded Phoenicia by sea and then marched inland to Damascus, while Cleopatra III besieged Ptolemais Akko. Ptolemy IX attempted to slip past them and into Egypt, but Ptolemy X managed to rush back and stop him. Ptolemy IX spent the winter encamped at Gaza, before deciding to sail back to Cyprus in early 102 BC. Nothing further is known about his activities until 88 BC.

== Second reign (88–81 BC) ==
=== Restoration ===
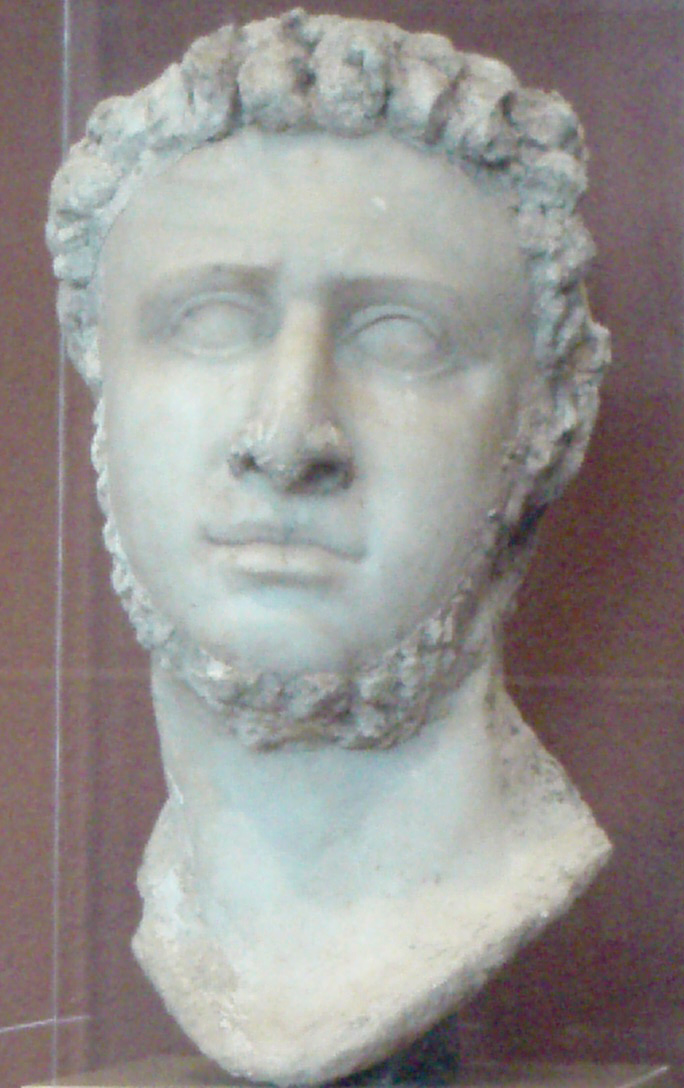
Probable bust of Ptolemy IX (or X), Museum of Fine Arts, Boston

The army and people of Alexandria turned against Ptolemy X in spring 88 BC and expelled him from Egypt. The Alexandrians then recalled Ptolemy IX to the throne. Ptolemy IX was formally re-crowned as pharaoh at Memphis in November. In his first reign, Ptolemy had borne the epithet Philometor Soter (Mother-loving saviour), but on his return he dropped the Philometor, since it recalled his mother. The cults and memory of Cleopatra III and Ptolemy X seem to have been officially suppressed.

When Ptolemy IX returned to Egypt, the south of the country had been under the control of Egyptian rebels since 91 BC. Ptolemy sent a large force south in November 88 BC, under the command of the general Hierax. Thebes was quickly recaptured and severely sacked. Ptolemaic control was restored as far south as Philae, but Lower Nubia, which had come under the control of the kingdom of Meroë during the revolt, was not reclaimed.

=== Roman claims and First Mithridatic War ===
After his expulsion from Alexandria, Ptolemy X made an attempt to invade Cyprus and recapture it, but was killed in the attempt. Before his death, however, he had taken out a large loan from the Roman Republic, in return for which he produced a will which left his kingdom to the Romans. Although they chose not to take advantage of this, the possibility of Roman intervention hung over Ptolemy IX for the rest of his reign and forced him to adopt a highly deferential posture with the Romans.

In 86 BC, a Roman fleet commanded by Lucullus arrived in Alexandria seeking financial and military support against Mithridates VI of Pontus, with whom the Romans were fighting the First Mithridatic War (89–84 BC). Ptolemy hosted Lucullus magnificently, but did not offer him any material support. This was probably partially due to the confused political situation – the Roman war effort was being led by Sulla, but he had been declared an outlaw by the government in Rome led by Lucius Cornelius Cinna. Moreover, Mithridates VI had captured Ptolemy's sons, who had been on Cos since 103 BC.

=== Death and succession ===
On 5 August 81 BC, Ptolemy IX promoted his daughter Berenice III, who had previously been the wife and co-regent of Ptolemy X, to the status of co-regent. Some sources claim that Ptolemy IX had made Berenice III his co-regent at the start of his second reign in 88 BC, but all documentary evidence shows that he reigned alone until 81 BC. Ptolemy died shortly thereafter, probably in December of the same year, leaving her alone on the throne. After a few months of sole rule, her cousin Ptolemy XI was placed on the throne as her co-regent, murdered her, was murdered himself, and was replaced by Ptolemy XII, another child of Ptolemy IX.

== Regime ==
In August 115 BC, Ptolemy IX travelled down the Nile to Elephantine to celebrate the festival there in honour of the Great God of the Nile – a traditional Pharaonic duty which was meant to give thanks for the inundation and ensure the success of the next. The fact that Ptolemy IX carried this ritual out personally, rather than letting a local priest carry it out in his stead, shows the extent to which Ptolemy embraced the Pharaonic role.

It is possible that construction of certain buildings occurred during the first reign of Ptolemy IX. This would have included work on the Dendera Temple complex and the temple in Edfu.

=== Relationship with Rome ===
A Roman embassy led by the senator Lucius Memmius, arrived in Egypt in 112 BC. As part of his visit, he was given a tour of the Faiyum region. Papyrus letters survive that instruct all local officials to treat him with the greatest respect and provide him with the most luxurious accommodation. The visit is a sign of the extent to which the Ptolemies now sought to conciliate the Roman Republic. It is also an early example of Roman tourism in Egypt, which would become a major phenomenon in the Roman Empire. A set of four graffiti at Philae provide evidence for another set of early Roman tourists. Dated to 116 BC, they are the earliest known examples of the Latin language found in Egypt.

== Marriages and issue ==
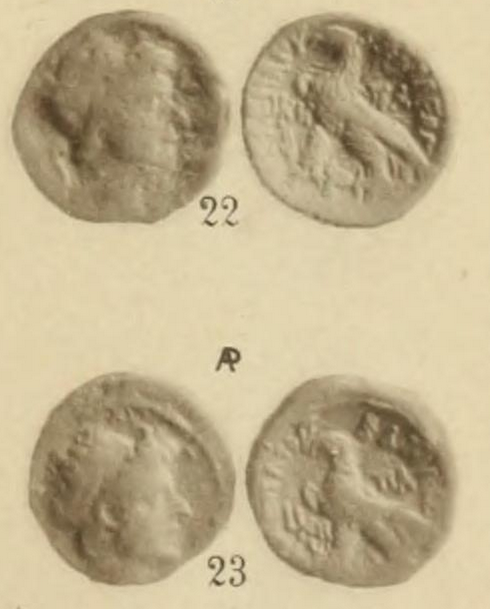
Rare drachms of Ptolemy XII minted at Paphos, Cyprus, in 53 BC

Ptolemy IX is only known to have married twice, first to Cleopatra IV from c. 119 BC until he was forced to divorce her in 115 BC, and secondly to Cleopatra Selene from 115 BC, until he abandoned her during his flight from Alexandria in 107 BC.

At least three children are attested for Ptolemy IX. The birth dates and parentage of his two sons Ptolemy XII and Ptolemy of Cyprus are disputed. According to Justin, Cleopatra Selene and Ptolemy IX had two children. The historian John Whitehorne noted that the existence of those two children is doubted and they might have died at a young age.

Ptolemy XII is referred to by Cicero and other ancient sources as an illegitimate son; Pompeius Trogus called him a "nothos" (bastard), while Pausanias wrote that Berenice III was Ptolemy IX's only legitimate offspring. This has discouraged the identification of Ptolemy XII and Ptolemy of Cyprus with the two sons mentioned by Justin. Michael Grant suggested that Ptolemy XII's mother was a Syrian or a partly Greek concubine while Günther Hölbl suggested that she was a member of the Egyptian elite. However, John Pentland Mahaffy and Christopher Bennett argue that they were considered illegitimate simply because their mother had not been a co-regnant queen. They propose Cleopatra IV as the mother, in which case Ptolemy XII and Ptolemy of Cyprus would have been born in 117 and 116 BC respectively. Bennett further proposes that Ptolemy XII and Ptolemy of Cyprus are identical with the two sons mentioned by Justin.

The mother of Ptolemy IX's daughter, Berenice III is also not certain. Cleopatra IV and Cleopatra Selene are candidates, with the former favoured by modern scholarship. Bennett noted that Berenice III's legitimacy was never questioned by ancient historians, and the illegitimacy of Ptolemy IX and Cleopatra IV's marriage makes it more probable that Berenice III was the result of a legitimate marriage, that is between her father and Cleopatra Selene.

Name	Image	Birth	Death	Notes
Ptolemy XII		117 or c. 98 BC	February/March 51 BC	King of Egypt (80–58 and 55–51 BC)
Ptolemy		116 or c. 96 BC?	58 BC	King of Cyprus (80–58 BC)
Berenice III		Late 115 or early 114 BC	April 80 BC	Co-regent with Ptolemy X (101–88 BC), Queen of Egypt (81–80 BC)

== Bibliography ==
- Bennett, Christopher J. (1997). "Cleopatra V Tryphæna and the Genealogy of the Later Ptolemies". Ancient Society. 28. Peeters Publishers: 39–66. doi:10.2143/AS.28.0.630068. ISSN 0066-1619.
- Fletcher, Joann (2008). Cleopatra the Great: The Woman Behind the Legend. Hodder & Stoughton. ISBN 978-0-340-83173-1.
- Hölbl, Günther (2001). A History of the Ptolemaic Empire. London & New York: Routledge. ISBN 0415201454.
- Sullivan, Richard (1990). Near Eastern Royalty and Rome, 100–30 BC. Phoenix: Supplementary Volume. Vol. 24. University of Toronto Press. ISBN 978-0-802-02682-8.
- Whitehorne, John (1994). Cleopatras. Routledge. ISBN 978-0-415-05806-3.

Ptolemy IX Soter Ptolemaic dynasty Born: 143/142 BC Died: 81 BC
Regnal titles
Preceded by Helenus of Cyrene	Governor of Cyprus; 117–116 BC	Succeeded by Ptolemy X
Preceded by Ptolemy VIII	Pharaoh of Egypt; 116–107 BC with Cleopatra III and Cleopatra IV	Succeeded by Cleopatra III; Ptolemy X
Preceded by Helenus of Cyrene	King of Cyprus; 105–88 BC	Succeeded by Chaereas?
Preceded by Ptolemy X Berenice III	Pharaoh of Egypt; 88–81 BC	Succeeded by Berenice III
