= Seleucia at the Zeugma =

Former settlement probably near Sırataşlar, Turkey

Seleucia at the Zeugma (Greek: Σελεύκεια ἐπὶ τοῦ Ζεύγματος, transliterated Seleukeia epi tou Zeugmatos) was a Hellenistic fortified town in the present Republic of Turkey on the left (south) bank of the Euphrates, across from ancient Samosata and not far from it.

It is mentioned in isolated incidents: Antiochus III the Great married a Pontic princess there in 221 BC; the Oxford Classical Dictionary ascribed this to Zeugma. Tigranes let Cleopatra Selene, the widow of Antiochus X Eusebes, be killed there. Pompey gave the city and its surroundings to Antiochus I Theos of Commagene; Pliny the Elder nonetheless ascribes it to Coele Syria. The bishop Eusebius of Samosata ruled a day's journey from his see, even to Zeugma. The name of the city is confirmed by an inscription from Rhodes, which refers to a man "of Seleucia, of those on the Euphrates".

The location of Seleucia at the Zeugma is uncertain. It had a bridge of boats, like the well-known (and now submerged) city of Zeugma, in Osrohene further downstream; which is too far downstream, and on the wrong side of the river to be the boundary of Eusebius' see. By the same reasoning, it cannot be either of the places called el Qantara ("bridge") which were just above, and 2 km below, modern Samsat, Turkey, before its old site was also flooded, by the Atatürk Reservoir. The Barrington Atlas conjectures that it was at Killik, Şanlıurfa Province, Turkey 37°26′N 38°14′E), on the basis of T. A. Sinclair's Eastern Turkey : an architectural and archaeological survey, which is some 40 km downstream from Samosata, and below the dam.

The reasoning here is unclear. Sinclair shows this Killik (which means "Claypit" in Turkish), on his map at IV 172, but all four of his references to the name in his text are to a Killik at 39°23′N 37°42′E, at the headwaters of the Euphrates, near Divriği.

== See also ==
- Zeugma, Commagene
- Zeugma Mosaic Museum
