= Ptolemy XI Alexander II =

1st century BC King of Egypt, Ptolemaic Dynasty

Ptolemy XI
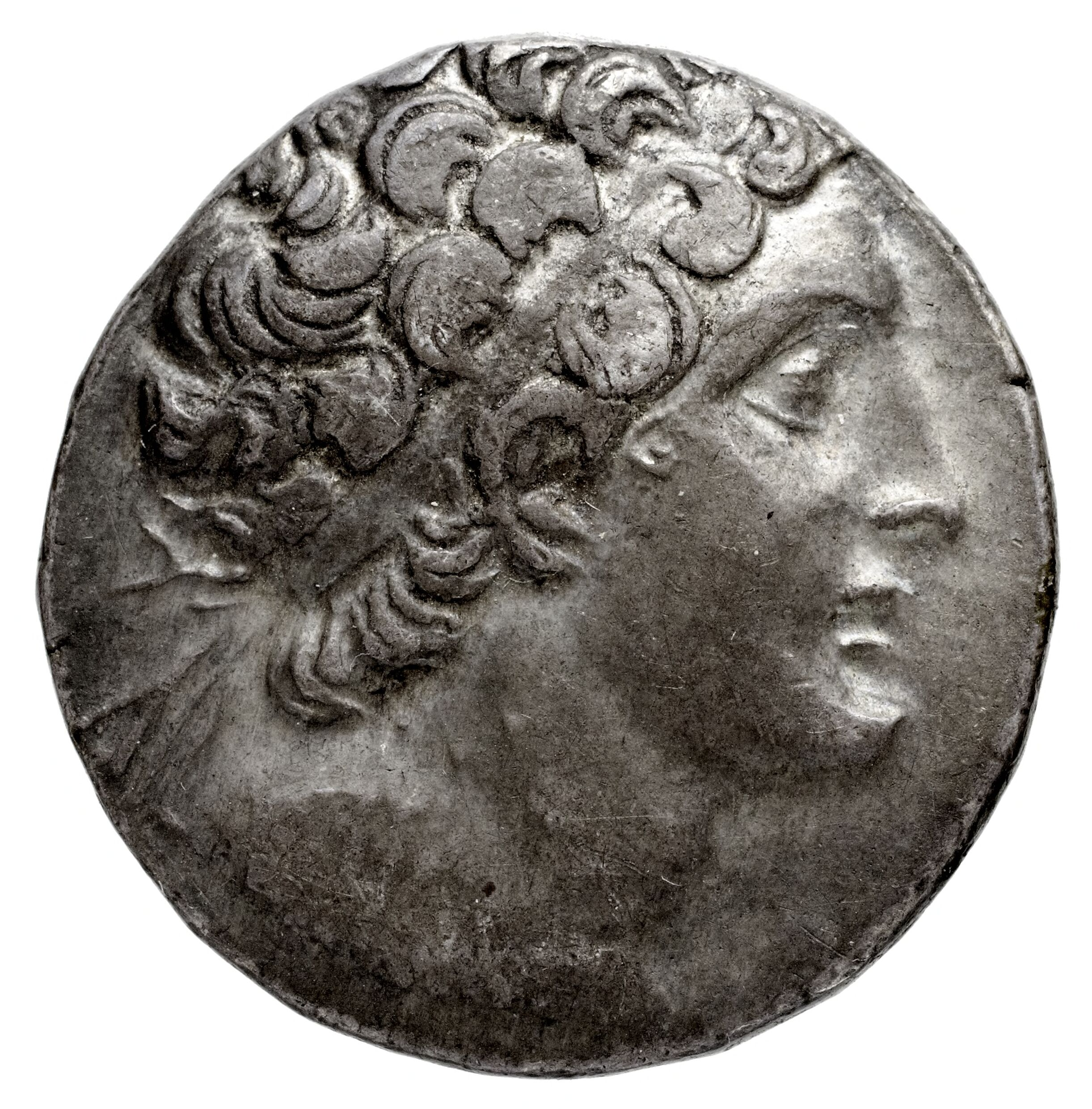
- Bust of Ptolemy XI from a coin

Pharaoh and King of the Ptolemaic Kingdom
- Reign: 80 BC
- Predecessor: Berenice III
- Successor: Ptolemy XII
- Consort: Berenice III
- Father: Ptolemy X Alexander I
- Mother: Cleopatra Selene

Ptolemy XI Alexander II (Note: Numbering the Ptolemies is a modern convention. Older sources may give a number one higher or lower. The most reliable way of determining which Ptolemy is being referred to in any given case is by epithet (e.g. "Philopator").) (Greek: Πτολεμαῖος Ἀλέξανδρος, Ptolemaĩos Aléxandros) was a member of the Ptolemaic dynasty who ruled Egypt for a few days in 80 BC. He was a son of Ptolemy X Alexander I and Cleopatra Selene.

== Biography ==
Ptolemy XI was born to Ptolemy X Alexander I and supposedly Cleopatra Selene. His uncle Ptolemy IX Lathryos died in 81 BC or 80 BC, leaving only his sole legitimate daughter as his heir, and so Cleopatra Berenice (= Berenice III) ruled alone for a time. Rome's Sulla wanted a pro-Roman ruler on the throne, and sent the young son of Ptolemy X to Egypt, displaying Ptolemy Alexander's will in Rome as supposed justification for this obvious interference.

The will also apparently required Ptolemy XI to marry Berenice III, who was his stepmother, cousin, and possible half-sister. Nineteen days after the marriage, Ptolemy murdered his bride for unknown reasons, an unwise move since Berenice was very popular. Ptolemy was soon lynched by the citizens of Alexandria.

He was succeeded by his cousin Ptolemy XII, an illegitimate son of Ptolemy IX.

== Notes ==
Ptolemy XI Alexander II Ptolemaic dynasty Born: ? Died: 80 BC
Regnal titles
Preceded by Berenice III	Pharaoh of Egypt; 80 BC with Berenice III	Succeeded by Ptolemy XII
