= Cleopatra Selene of Syria =

Queen of Syria from 82 to 69 BC

Cleopatra Selene
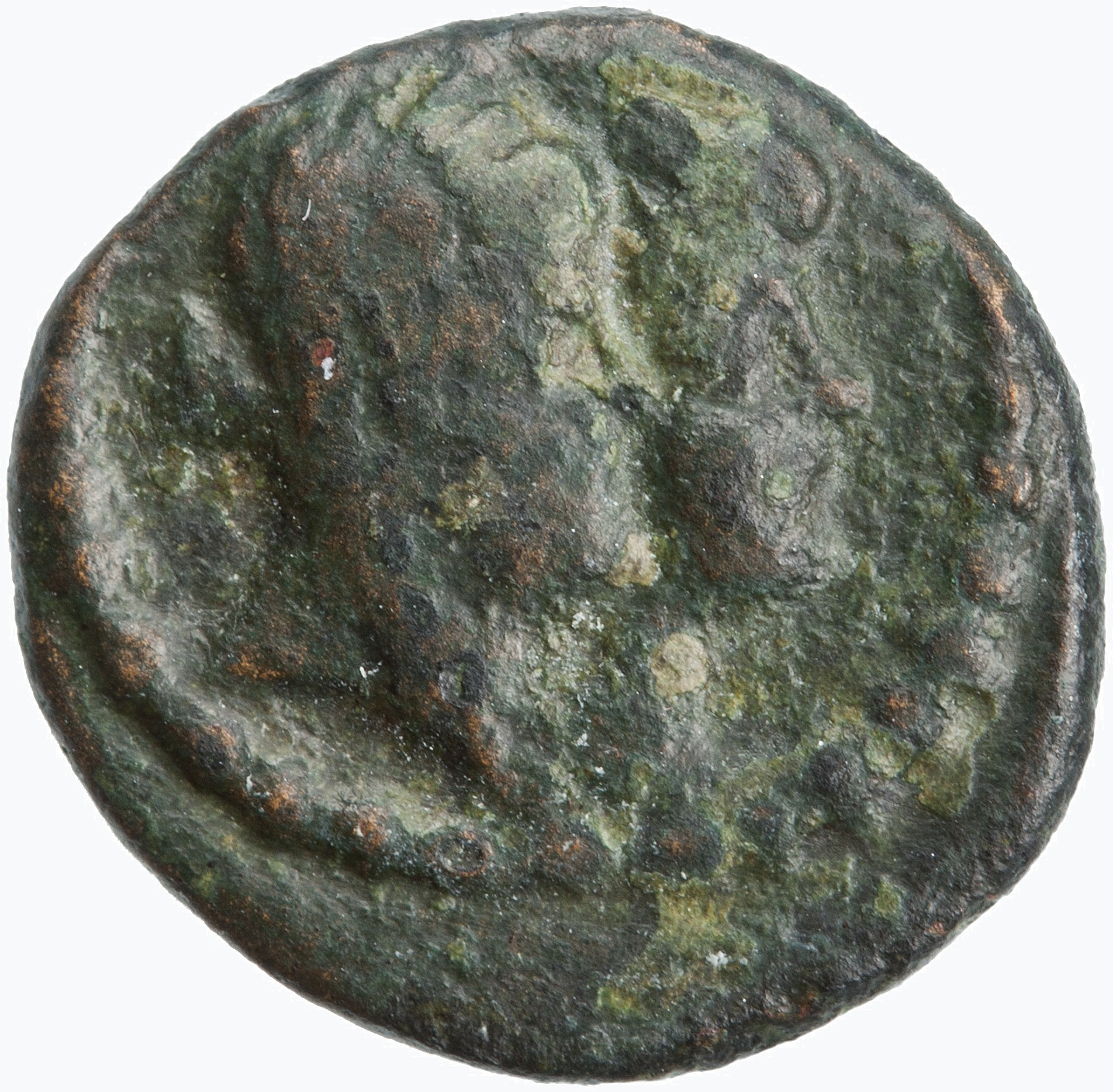
- Jugate bronze coin depicting Cleopatra Selene in the foreground with her son Antiochus XIII in the background

Queen consort of Egypt
- Tenure: 115–107 BC; 107–102 BC

Queen consort of Syria
- Tenure: 102–96 BC; 95 BC; 95–92 BC

Queen regnant of Syria
- Reign: 82–69 BC (also regent for her co-monarch Antiochus XIII between 82 and 75 BC)
- Predecessors: Antiochus XII; Philip I
- Successor: Antiochus XIII
- Co-ruler: Antiochus XIII
- Born: c. 135–130 BC
- Died: 69 BC; Seleucia (now in Gaziantep Province, Turkey)
- Spouses: Ptolemy IX (115–107 BC; divorced); Ptolemy X (107–102 BC; divorced); Antiochus VIII (102–96 BC; widowed); Antiochus IX (95 BC; widowed); Antiochus X (95–92 BC; widowed)
- Issue among others...: Berenice III; Antiochus XIII
- Dynasty: Ptolemaic (by birth); Seleucid (by marriage)
- Father: Ptolemy VIII
- Mother: Cleopatra III

Cleopatra Selene (Ancient Greek: Κλεοπάτρα Σελήνη; c. between 135 and 130 – 69 BC) was the Queen consort of Egypt (Cleopatra Selene or Cleopatra V Selene) from 115 to 102 BC, the Queen consort of Syria from 102 to 92 BC, and the monarch of Syria (Cleopatra II) from 82 to 69 BC. The daughter of Ptolemy VIII Physcon and Cleopatra III of Egypt, Cleopatra Selene was favoured by her mother and became a pawn in Cleopatra III's political manoeuvres. In 115 BC, Cleopatra III forced her son Ptolemy IX to divorce his sister-wife Cleopatra IV, and chose Cleopatra Selene as the new queen consort of Egypt. Tension between the king and his mother grew and ended with his expulsion from Egypt, leaving Cleopatra Selene behind; she probably then married the new king, her other brother Ptolemy X.

Following the marriage of the Syrian Seleucid princess Cleopatra I to Ptolemy V of Egypt, dynastic marriages between the two kingdoms became common. In 102 BC, Cleopatra III decided to establish an alliance with her nephew Antiochus VIII of Syria; Cleopatra Selene was sent as his bride. After his assassination in 96 BC, she married his brother and rival Antiochus IX. Cleopatra Selene lost her new husband in 95 BC and married a final time to Antiochus IX's son Antiochus X, who disappeared from the records and is presumed to have died in 92 BC, but may have remained in power until 89/88 BC (224 SE (Seleucid year)). (Note: Some years in the article are given according to the Seleucid era. Each Seleucid year started in the late autumn of a Gregorian year; thus, a Seleucid year overlaps two Gregorian ones.) Cleopatra Selene then hid somewhere in the kingdom with her children. Eventually, Syria split between the sons of Antiochus VIII with Philip I ruling in the Syrian capital Antioch and Antiochus XII in the southern city Damascus.

Cleopatra Selene had many children by several husbands. Probably following the death of Antiochus XII in 230 SE (83/82 BC), she declared Antiochus XIII, her son by Antiochus X, king, and seems to have declared herself co-ruler; they claimed Antioch following Philip I's death. But the people of Antioch and the governor of Damascus, exhausted by the Seleucids' civil wars, invited foreign monarchs to rule them: Tigranes II of Armenia took Antioch, while Aretas III of Nabataea took Damascus. Cleopatra Selene controlled several coastal towns until Tigranes II besieged her in 69 BC in Ptolemais; the Armenian king captured the queen and later executed her.

== Historical background, family and name ==
By the second century BC, the Seleucid Empire and the Ptolemaic Kingdom were weakened by dynastic feuds, constant wars against each other (known as the Syrian Wars), and Roman interference. To ease the tension, the two dynasties intermarried. Cleopatra I of Syria married Ptolemy V of Egypt in 193 BC, and her granddaughter Cleopatra Thea married three Syrian kings in succession starting in 150 BC. Those intermarriages helped Egypt destabilize Syria which was especially fragmented between different claimants to the throne; brothers fought between themselves and Egypt interfered by supporting one claimant against the other.

Cleopatra Selene was born between 135 and 130 BC to Ptolemy VIII and Cleopatra III. Cleopatra Selene had many siblings, including Ptolemy IX, Ptolemy X, and Cleopatra IV. Ancient writers, such as Cicero and Appian, mention that the queen's name is Selene, and Strabo clarified that she was surnamed "Cleopatra". On the other hand, modern scholars, such as Arthur Houghton and Catharine Lorber, believed that Selene was actually an epithet. The archaeologist Nicholas L. Wright suggested that she assumed the epithet "Selene" when she became queen of Egypt and that it is a divinising epithet, indicating that Cleopatra Selene presented herself as the manifestation of the moon goddess on earth. Coins struck in her name record her as Cleopatra Selene. Selene was the name of the Greek moon goddess and it is connected to the word selas (σέλας), meaning "light". "Cleopatra" was a Ptolemaic dynastic name; it means "famous in her father" or "renowned in her ancestry". As a queen of Syria, she was the second to rule with the name 'Cleopatra'. Hence, she is termed "Cleopatra II Selene" to differentiate her from her predecessor and aunt Cleopatra I Thea, (Note: In the Prosopographia Ptolemaica, Selene's entry is numbered 14520.) who was the mother of Cleopatra Selene's husbands Antiochus VIII and Antiochus IX. Classicist Grace Macurdy numbered Cleopatra Selene as "Cleopatra V" within the Ptolemaic dynasty and many historians have used this convention.

== Queen of Egypt ==
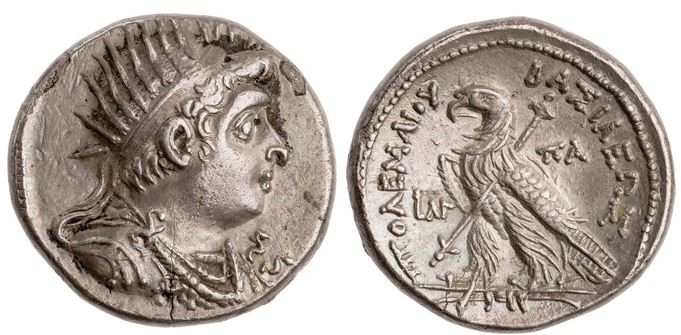
Ptolemy VIII

Sibling marriage was known in ancient Egypt and, although it was not a general practice, it was acceptable for the Egyptians; the Ptolemies practised it, perhaps to consolidate the dynasty. In 116 BC, Ptolemy VIII died and his will left Cleopatra III to rule alongside a co-ruler of her choice from between her two sons; she wanted to choose Ptolemy X but the people of Alexandria (the capital of Egypt) opposed this, forcing her to accept Ptolemy IX's ascension to the throne. Shortly after his elevation, Cleopatra III forced Ptolemy IX to divorce Cleopatra IV, his sister whom he had married before their father's death; the 2nd-century historian Justin implied that Cleopatra III made this a condition of accepting him as co-ruler. Cleopatra Selene, favoured by her mother Cleopatra III, was chosen as the new queen consort in 115 BC. In 107 BC, the relationship between Ptolemy IX and his mother deteriorated; Cleopatra III forced him out of Egypt, and he left his wife and children behind.

The same year, 107 BC, Cleopatra Selene was probably married off to the new king, her younger brother, Ptolemy X. In 103 BC, Ptolemy IX was fighting in Judea. The queen mother feared an alliance against her between Ptolemy IX and his friend Antiochus IX of Syria, who was fighting a civil war with his brother Antiochus VIII; this led her to send troops to Syria. Cleopatra III and Ptolemy X conquered Ptolemais, and according to Justin, the king, shocked by his mother's cruelty, abandoned her and ran away; Cleopatra III then decided to marry Cleopatra Selene to Antiochus VIII, as a step to bring Antiochus VIII to her side in order to counter an alliance between Ptolemy IX and Antiochus IX. If it is accepted that Cleopatra Selene married Ptolemy X, then Cleopatra III divorced her from him after he deserted. (Note: Justin wrote that Cleopatra III "made two daughters husbandless by marrying them to their brothers in turn". This, in Christopher J. Bennett's view, indicates the divorce of Cleopatra Selene and Ptolemy X; it directly claimed that each of Cleopatra III's sons was forced to divorce his sister by the queen mother. It is known that Ptolemy IX was forced to divorce Cleopatra IV, who, afterwards, was never in a position where the queen mother could force her to be divorced from Ptolemy X. This leaves a forced divorce between Cleopatra Selene and Ptolemy X as the only possible option to explain Justin's remark.)

== Queen of Syria ==
=== Queen consort ===
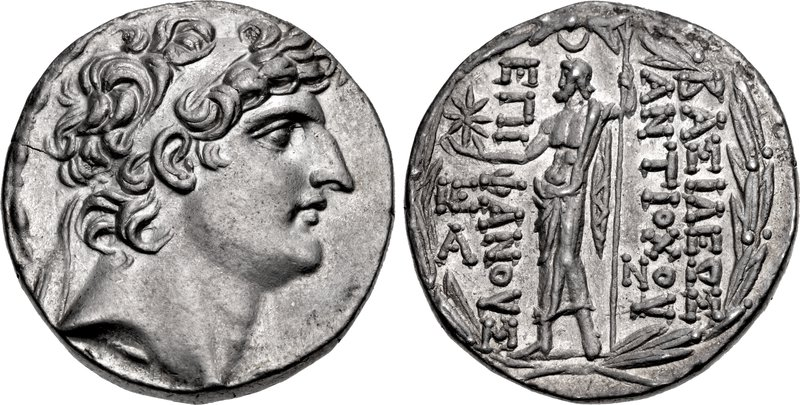
Antiochus VIII

The marriage of Cleopatra Selene and Antiochus VIII took place c. 102 BC; historian Leo Kadman suggested that Cleopatra III gave her daughter to the Syrian king in Ptolemais before she retreated to Egypt, and that Cleopatra Selene kept that city as her main base until the end of her life. Details of Cleopatra Selene's life with Antiochus VIII are not clear; no known offspring resulted from the marriage, though six of Antiochus VIII's children from his previous marriage are known. In 96 BC, Herakleon of Beroia, a general of Antiochus VIII, assassinated his monarch and tried to usurp the throne, but failed and retreated to his home-town Beroia. (Note: The numismatist Arthur Houghton suggested the year 97 BC for Antiochus VIII's assassination because the coins of his son Seleucus VI suggest an earlier date than 96 BC. This is contested by the numismatist Oliver D. Hoover who noted that Houghton's reason for lowering Antiochus VIII's death year was Seleucus VI's unusually high coin production, but it was not rare for a king to double his production in a single year at times of need; hence, the year 96 BC remains more possible.) The capital of Syria, Antioch, was part of Antiochus VIII's realm at the time of his assassination; Cleopatra Selene probably resided there. (Note: In the view of John Whitehorne, Cleopatra Selene stayed in the palace under Herakleon then fled to Antiochus IX in Antioch after realizing that Herakleon would never be accepted as king. There is no evidence that Herakleon ever controlled Antioch, and the place where he assassinated his king is not known.)

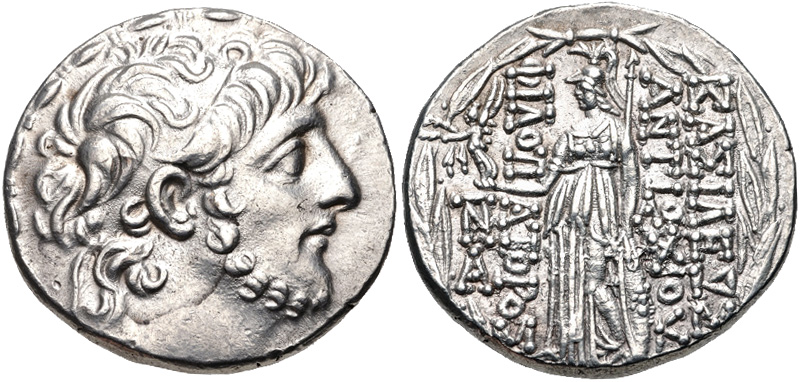
Antiochus IX

The queen held out in the capital for a while before marrying Antiochus IX. The manner in which Antiochus IX took control of Antioch and his new wife in 95 BC is not clear; he could have taken the city by force or it could be that Cleopatra Selene herself opened the gates for him. In the view of historian Auguste Bouché-Leclercq, Cleopatra Selene had little reason to trust the five sons of her previous husband; the queen needed an ally who would help her control the capital while Antiochus IX needed a wife and Cleopatra Selene's influence over the city's garrison and her late husband's officials. It is unlikely that this marriage was received well by Antiochus VIII's sons. The first of them to act was Seleucus VI who was established in Cilicia. Within a year of his marriage to Cleopatra Selene, Antiochus IX marched against his nephew but was defeated and killed. Soon afterwards, Seleucus entered the capital. Cleopatra Selene probably fled before the new king's arrival. Alternatively, she might have been sent to Arados by Antiochus IX for protection before he marched against Seleucus.

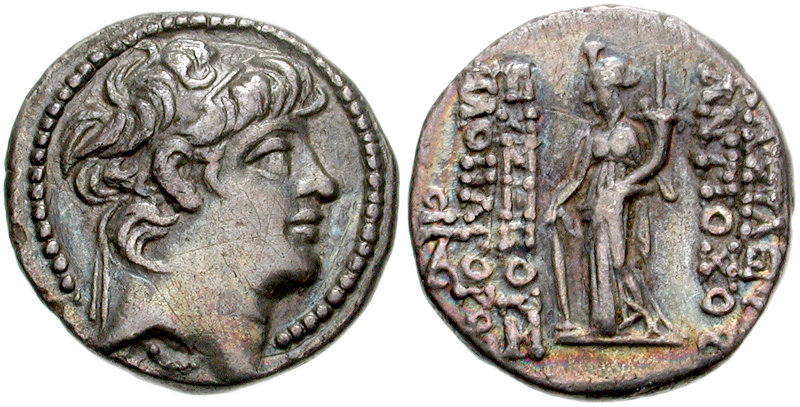
Antiochus X

In 218 SE (95/94 BC), Antiochus X, the son of Antiochus IX, proclaimed himself king in Arados, and married Cleopatra Selene. The Seleucid dynasty had a precedent of a son marrying his stepmother: Antiochus I had married his stepmother Stratonice, and this might have made it easier for Cleopatra Selene. Yet, the marriage was scandalous. Appian wrote an anecdote concerning the epithet of Antiochus X, "Eusebes" ("the pious"): the Syrians gave it to him to mock his show of loyalty to his father by bedding his widow. The rationale for the marriage might have been pragmatic: Antiochus X sought to be king, but had little resources and needed a queen. Cleopatra Selene was in her forties and could not simply marry a foreign king. (Note: The age of Selene raised questions amongst modern historians; it is known that the queen bore two children for Antiochus X, and Edwyn Bevan suggested that the wife of Antiochus X was a younger woman who was also named "Selene". Macurdy rejected this hypothesis for several reasons; Appian made it clear that Cleopatra Selene who married Antiochus X was the same woman who married Antiochus VIII and Antiochus IX. Eusebius confirmed that Cleopatra Selene, the wife of Ptolemy IX, was the same woman who later married the Seleucid kings. Also, the wife of Antiochus X sent her children to Rome to petition the senate for their rights on the Ptolemaic throne and a woman with no direct connections to the royal family would not make such a claim.) Antiochus X pushed Seleucus VI out of Antioch in 94 BC and ruled northern Syria and Cilicia, while Seleucus VI's brothers Philip I and Demetrius III ruled Beroea and Damascus respectively. The last evidence for the reign of Antiochus X is dated to 92 BC; he is generally assumed to have died at around this date. Ancient sources contain contradictory accounts and dates, and the numismatist Oliver D. Hoover suggested the date of 224 SE (89/88 BC) for Antiochus X's demise. Antioch was taken by Demetrius III then Philip I.

=== Queen regnant and regent ===
Syria in c. 87 BC

Cleopatra Selene's location during the reign of Antiochus X's successors in Antioch is unknown. She evidently took shelter with her children somewhere in the kingdom, and possibly fled to Cilicia or Coele-Syria, probably the city of Ptolemais, which she held until her death. Antiochus XII, another son of Antiochus VIII who was ruling in Damascus, died in 230 SE (83/82 BC). With the throne of Antiochus XII vacant, Cleopatra Selene declared her son Antiochus XIII king. (Note: The succession of Cleopatra Selene and Antiochus XIII in the aftermath of Antiochus XII's death is not mentioned by ancient literary sources and is reconstructed using numismatic evidence.)

Based on the evidence of the coins depicting her alongside her ruling son, it appears that Cleopatra Selene acted as the regent. Many of those coins have been found, (Note: In 1949, one of them, from the collection of Henri Arnold Seyrig, was dated by Alfred Bellinger to 92 BC leading some modern historians, such as Kay Ehling, to propose that Cleopatra Selene ruled Antioch in the interval between the death of her last husband and the arrival of Demetrius III. Bellinger himself had doubts regarding his own dating which he expressed in 1952; this coin is dated to c. 82 BC by many twenty first century numismatists.) and they depict Antiochus XIII in the background and herself in the foreground, in the style of a queen regnant, where Cleopatra Selene's name is written before that of the king's. When she declared her son king, Cleopatra Selene controlled lands in Cilicia or Phoenicia or both. The archaeologist Alfred Bellinger suggested that she was in control of several coastal Syrian cities from a base in Cilicia; she certainly controlled Ptolemais and probably Seleucia Pieria. The 1st-century historian Josephus wrote of "Selene ... who ruled in Syria", indicating her continued influence despite her never controlling the capital Antioch. Her children probably remained in Cilicia or somewhere else in Asia Minor for protection, which would explain Antiochus XIII's nickname, "Asiaticus".

==== Reign in Damascus ====
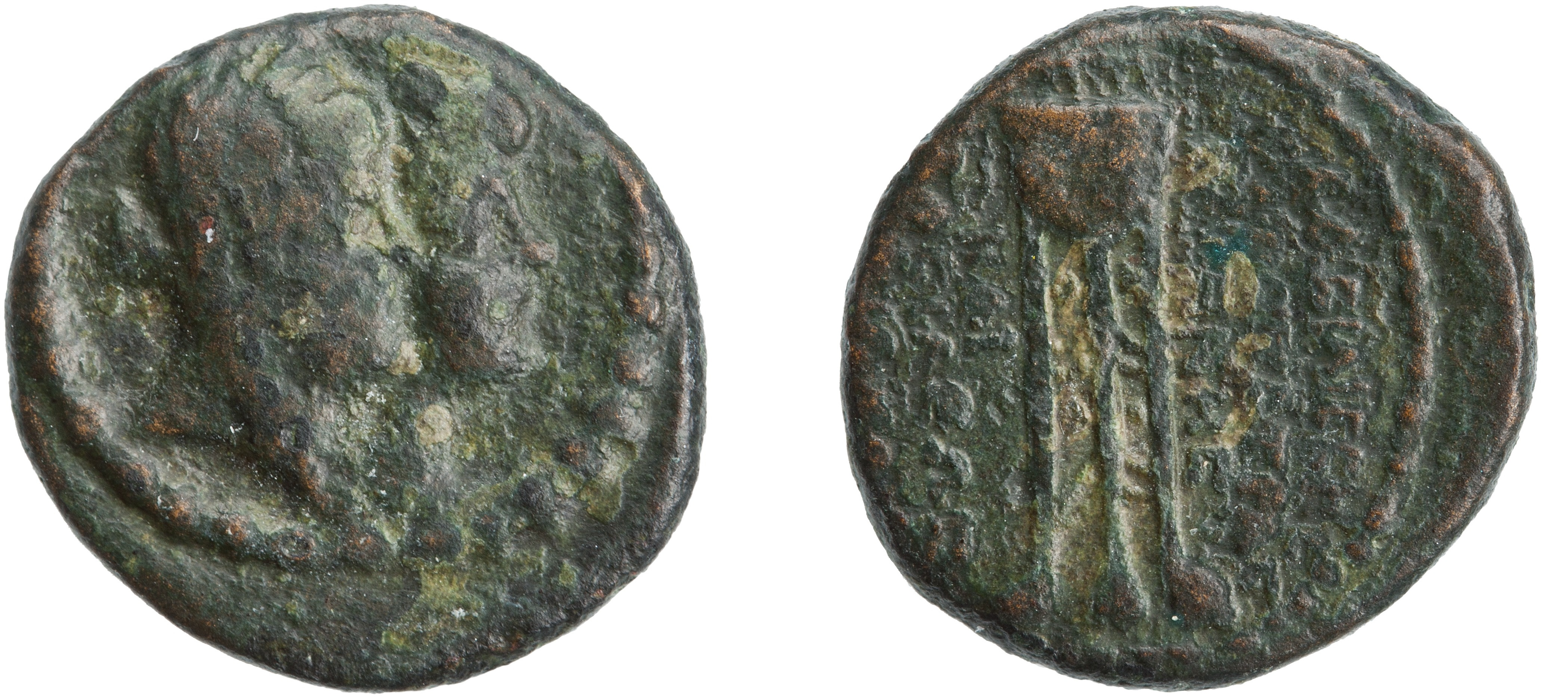
Bronze coin of Cleopatra Selene and Antiochus XIII. The reverse indicates that it was minted in Damascus

According to Josephus, "those that held Damascus" invited Aretas III, King of the Nabataeans, to rule them because they feared Ptolemy (son of Mennaeus), king of the Iturea. Damascus' history between the death of Antiochus XII and 241 SE (72/71 BC), when the Armenian king Tigranes II took the city, is obscure. Based on her jugate coins which depict her alongside Antiochus XIII, Hoover suggested that Selene operated from Damascus; those coins used a broken-bar Alpha, cursive Epsilon and squared Sigma. This typography appeared in the Damascene coins of Demetrius III and Antiochus XII and is otherwise rare in the Hellenistic world. If her currency was minted in Damascus, (Note: Brian Kritt and Michael Roy Burgess suggested Ptolemais.) then it dates to the period between the death of Antiochus XII and Tigranes II's occupation of the city. Two scenarios are possible:

- Cleopatra Selene took Damascus after Antiochus XII's death and was replaced by Aretas III before 73 BC: Josephus does not name the people of Damascus as the party who invited Aretas III, rather, his words indicate that a garrison or a governor conducted the act. All known coins of Cleopatra Selene are made of bronze, and the absence of silver coinage indicates that the queen lacked the necessary resources to defend Damascus, which would explain the invitation of Aretas III. It is also possible that Cleopatra Selene moved her capital to Ptolemais, causing her troops in Damascus to lose faith in her rule, leading them to invite the Nabataean king.
- Aretas III's rule in Damascus did not last long before Cleopatra Selene took control: Wright suggested that Cleopatra Selene's takeover of Damascus took place after 80 BC. Several factors might have compelled the Nabataeans to withdraw, such as the Ituraean threats or the attacks of the Hasmonean Judaean king Alexander Jannaeus, whose incursions into Nabataean lands must have made their position in Damascus difficult.

==== Claiming the north ====
In the north, Philip I ruled until his death, after which Cleopatra Selene claimed the rights of her children with Antiochus X to the vacant throne. The queen's claims of authority were not generally accepted by the Syrians, and the people of Antioch invited Tigranes II to rule Syria, being frustrated by the Seleucids' constant civil wars. The year in which this event took place is debated; 83 BC is, without any proof, commonly accepted as Philip I's year of death by the majority of scholars who count on the account of Appian, who assigned a reign of fourteen years for Tigranes II in Syria, which ended in 69 BC. Oliver D. Hoover suggested that Tigranes II invaded Syria only in 74 BC, with Philip I ruling until 75 BC in Northern Syria, allowing Cleopatra Selene and Antiochus XIII to claim the country unopposed for a while. An argument in favour of Cleopatra Selene and her son being the sole claimants of Syria in 75 BC is a statement by Cicero: the Roman statesman wrote that Antiochus XIII and his brother were sent to Rome by their mother in 75 BC. The brothers went to petition the Roman Senate for their right to the throne of Egypt based on their mother's birthright. To impress the Senate, the queen endowed her children with sufficient assets, which included a jewelled candelabrum that was dedicated to the temple of Jupiter Capitolinus. The Senate refused to hear their petition for the Egyptian throne, but, according to Cicero, their de jure right to the Syrian throne, which they had inherited from their ancestors, was already acknowledged. Antiochus and his brother returned to Syria in 240 SE (73/72 BC).

The statement of Cicero indicates that in 75 BC, Tigranes II was still not in control of Syria, for if he were, Antiochus XIII would have asked the Roman Senate for support to regain Syria, since Tigranes II was the son-in-law of Rome's enemy, Mithridates VI of Pontus. Likewise, Philip I could not have been alive since Antiochus XIII went to Rome without having to assert his right to Syria. In a paper presented at the 131st annual meeting of the American Historical Association, Nikolaus Overtoom, based on Hoover's chronology, suggested that Cleopatra Selene was in control of the south while Philip I ruled the north until 75 BC; his death meant that Cleopatra Selene's son was the strongest candidate to the throne, but Philip I's faction, being opposed to Cleopatra Selene, offered the crown to Tigranes II who invaded and conquered the country in 74 BC.

=== Downfall, assessment and legacy ===
The regency of Cleopatra Selene probably ended in 75 BC as the journey of Antiochus XIII to Rome indicates that he had already reached his majority or was close to it. Tigranes II, whose invasion probably took place during Antiochus XIII's absence, never controlled the entire country and took Damascus only in 72 BC. Cleopatra Selene resisted the Armenians in Ptolemais while Antiochus XIII probably took shelter in Cilicia. In 69 BC, Tigranes II besieged Ptolemais; the city fell according to Josephus, but Tigranes II had to move north fast as the Romans started attacking Armenia. According to Strabo, Tigranes II imprisoned the queen in Seleucia and later had her killed. Those accounts seem to contradict each other, but in the view of the seventeenth century historian William Whiston, they do not, since Josephus does not mention that Tigranes II captured the queen in Ptolemais. Historian John D. Grainger explained Tigranes II's action as a consequence of Cleopatra Selene's political importance; she was a winning card in the hands of her husbands, and Tigranes II sought to deny other ambitious men from acquiring influence through her. Others see Cleopatra Selene as a pawn in political schemes who later evolved into a schemer in her own right, one who decided her actions effectively based on her own benefit.

Cleopatra Selene's long career, as the wife of three successive Syrian monarchs, and the mother of one and a ruler in her own right, in addition to her divine status, turned her into a symbol of Seleucid continuity. The ancient Near East was ruled by successive dynasties whose monarchs claimed the title of Great King, i.e. imperial overlord. When the Romans ended the Seleucid dynasty in 64 BC, they attempted to simply replace the Syrian monarchs as an imperial authority, but the political reality of Rome as a republic meant that its legitimacy in the East was questioned. The Seleucid diadem was considered a symbol of legitimacy even after the fall of the Seleucid dynasty, and many eastern kings, such as the Parthian monarch Mithridates II, used Seleucid royal iconography to gain the local nobility's support in their domains. The Ptolemaic rulers of Egypt were the closest relatives of the Seleucids and their legitimate successors; Cleopatra VII of Egypt used the name of Cleopatra Selene for her daughter Cleopatra Selene of Mauretania, born 40 BC; this can be viewed in the context of Cleopatra VII's attempts to claim the Seleucid succession rights in the East.

== Issue ==
=== By Ptolemy IX ===
- According to Justin, Cleopatra Selene and Ptolemy IX had two children; the historian John Whitehorne noted that the existence of those two children is doubted and they might have died at a young age. In 103 BC, Cleopatra III sent all her grandsons and treasures to the island of Kos for protection in preparation for her war with Ptolemy IX. In 88 BC, Mithridates VI captured all the Egyptian royals in Kos; the two children of Cleopatra Selene mentioned by Justin, if they actually existed and were sent to Kos by Cleopatra III, would have been among the captured.
- Ptolemy XII, the father of Cleopatra VII, and his brother Ptolemy of Cyprus. Ptolemy XII's legitimacy was historically questioned; (Note: The Romans generally accepted Ptolemy XII as legitimate. Many ancient writers questioned Ptolemy XII's legitimacy; Pompeius Trogus called him a "nothos" (bastard), while Pausanias wrote that Berenice III was Ptolemy IX's only legitimate offspring. Michael Grant suggested that Ptolemy XII's mother was a Syrian or a partly Greek concubine while Günther Hölbl suggested that she was an Egyptian elite. Robert Steven Bianchi declared that "there is unanimity amongst genealogists that the identification, and hence ethnicity, of the maternal grandmother of Cleopatra VIII is currently not known".) his father was certainly Ptolemy IX but his mother's identity is vague. Cicero wrote that Ptolemy XII was royal "neither in birth nor in spirit", but the classicist John Pentland Mahaffy noted that Cicero's words indicate that Ptolemy XII's mother was not a reigning queen at his birth, and so could be Cleopatra IV, whose marriage to Ptolemy IX can be considered morganatic (a marriage between people of unequal social rank), since it was not acceptable that a Ptolemaic prince marry his sister prior to his ascension to the throne. (Note: Ptolemy IX might have married Cleopatra IV while a prince ruling Cyprus; no other Ptolemaic king married his sister before ascending the throne. the historian Christopher J. Bennett suggested that Ptolemy IX's marriage to Cleopatra IV breached important rules of the dynasty: incest was not part of Greek culture and Ptolemaic brother-sister marriages were justified by the divinity of the king; a prince marrying his sister was an act of claiming divinity enjoyed only by the king, and any children born to a prince and his sister before his ascension were likely to be considered illegitimate by the royal family.)
  The historian Christopher J. Bennett considered Ptolemy XII and his brother identical with the two children mentioned by Justin, (Note: Ptolemy XI, son of Ptolemy X, was among the princes captured by Mithridates VI and escaped, but it is known that Mithridates still had two Egyptian princes in his hands. Ptolemy XII and his brother Ptolemy of Cyprus were in Syria before being called to Egypt following Ptolemy XI's death; according to Whitehorne, this could be explained with them being the two children of Cleopatra Selene who made it to Syria from Pontus when Mithridates' son in law Tigranes II conquered it. But Whitehorne then noted that the tradition of Ptolemy XII's illegitimacy is mentioned by contemporary authors and that Cleopatra Selene confirmed it when she tried to oust Ptolemy XII from Egypt in the 70s BC and replace him with one of her legitimate children.) but proposed that they were the children of Cleopatra IV, considered illegitimate because of their parents' "morganatic" marriage. Hence, Cleopatra Selene was not the biological mother, rather, she was the official mother, thus explaining her attempt to raise one of her sons by Antiochus X to the throne of Egypt in 75 BC by repudiating Ptolemy XII's legitimacy. (Note: Walter Gustav Albrecht Otto and Hermann Bengtson also argued that Ptolemy XII and his brother were the two children of Ptolemy IX and Cleopatra Selene mentioned by Justin; they explained the illegitimacy claims as a tool exploited by influential Romans who were hoping to benefit from Ptolemy XI's will which allegedly bequeathed Egypt to Rome.) Whitehorne, citing Cleopatra Selene's denial of Ptolemy XII's illegitimacy, refused to identify Ptolemy XII and his brother as the two children mentioned in Justin's work.
- Cleopatra Berenice (Berenice III), whose mother's identity is not certain, might have been a daughter of Cleopatra Selene, but Cleopatra IV is also a candidate and is favoured by modern scholarship. Bennett noted that Berenice III's legitimacy was never questioned by ancient historians, and the illegitimacy of Ptolemy IX and Cleopatra IV's marriage makes it more probable that Berenice III was the result of a legitimate marriage, that is between her father and Cleopatra Selene.

=== By Ptolemy X ===
Ptolemy X's son, Ptolemy XI, might have been the child of Cleopatra IV. Following Cleopatra IV's expulsion from Egypt in 115 BC, she went to Cyprus where Ptolemy X resided, but she departed quickly to Syria and married Antiochus IX; if Ptolemy XI was her son, then her abandonment of Cyprus is hard to explain, and her son would not have been considered legitimate, while the legitimacy of Ptolemy XI was unquestioned. Berenice III was mentioned as a mother of Ptolemy XI in a Demotic text, but the Egyptian word used to denote a "son" can also mean a step son, which is the meaning preferred by most scholars for the word in the text mentioning Berenice III as a mother of Ptolemy XI. Cleopatra Selene is the most suitable candidate; among several arguments in favor of Cleopatra Selene, Bennett noted that Berenice III was called by Cicero a sister of Ptolemy XI. If Ptolemy XI and Berenice III were both children of Cleopatra Selene, then the statement of Cicero can be taken literally. Cleopatra Selene's maternity of Ptolemy XI can not be confirmed, and which of Ptolemy X's wives bore Ptolemy XI remains unknown.

=== By Antiochus X ===
Identifying Antiochus X and Cleopatra Selene's children is problematic; Cicero wrote that the queen had two sons, one of them named Antiochus. More children, perhaps a daughter, might have resulted from the marriage, but it can not be confirmed; according to Plutarch, Tigranes II "put to death the successors of Seleucus, and [carried] off their wives and daughters into captivity". Thus, it is possible that Cleopatra Selene had a daughter captured by Tigranes II.

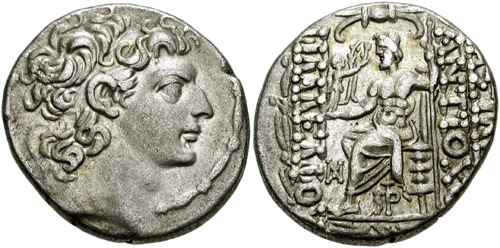
Antiochus XIII, coin bearing the epithet Philadelphos

- Antiochus XIII: this son is the Antiochus of Cicero, who, as a sole monarch following his mother's death, appears on his coins as Antiochus Philadelphos ("brother-loving"), but on coins where Cleopatra Selene is depicted along with her ruling son, the king is named Antiochus Philometor ("mother-loving"). This has led scholars to propose various theories: Kay Ehling, reasserting the view of Bouché-Leclercq, suggested that Cleopatra Selene had two sons, both named Antiochus. But Cicero, who left one of the brothers unnamed, is clear that only one of them was named Antiochus; for Ehling's proposal to be valid, Antiochus Philometor should be the Antiochus mentioned by Cicero, then he died and his brother, who had a different name, assumed the dynastic name Antiochus with the epithet Philadelphos, but this scenario is complicated and remains a mere hypothesis. Thus, Antiochus XIII bore two epithets: Philadelphos and Philometor.
- Seleucus Kybiosaktes: the second son of Cleopatra Selene, who was unnamed by Cicero and does not appear in other ancient sources, is generally identified by modern scholarship with a character named Seleucus Kybiosaktes, who appeared c. 58 BC in Egypt as a husband of Berenice IV of Egypt. Kybiosaktes was never associated with Cleopatra Selene in the ancient sources; solid evidence is lacking and the identification remains a theory. (Note: Cassius Dio mentioned a certain "Seleucus" who appeared in 58 BC as a husband of Berenice IV whom she had killed, while Strabo mentioned that the Syrian husband had the epithet "Kybiosaktes" ("salt-fish dealer") and pretended to be of Seleucid lineage before being killed by the queen. Thus, Bellinger named Berenice IV's short-lived husband Seleucus Kybiosaktes. Eusebius, who took the information from Porphyry, wrote that Antiochus X himself asked for Berenice's hand but died of a sudden illness, and he is suspected to be the same as Kybiosaktes by Edwyn Bevan. The parallels between the accounts of Cassius Dio and Strabo suggest that those historians were writing about the same person, and modern scholarship has come to identify Cleopatra Selene's unnamed son with Seleucus Kybiosaktes but this remain a theory.)
- Seleucus VII: in 2002, the numismatist Brian Kritt announced the discovery and decipherment of a coin bearing the portrait of Cleopatra Selene and a co-ruler; Kritt read the name of the ruler as Seleucus Philometor and, based on the epithet, identified him with Cleopatra Selene's son, unnamed by Cicero. Kritt gave the newly discovered ruler the regnal name Seleucus VII, and considered it very likely that he is identical with Kybiosaktes. The reading of "Seleucus VII" was accepted by some scholars such as Lloyd Llewellyn Jones and Michael Roy Burgess, but Hoover rejected Kritt's reading, noting that the coin was badly damaged and some letters were unreadable; Hoover read the king's name as Antiochus and identified him with Antiochus XIII. According to Wright, if the reading of Kritt is accepted, then it is possible that Cleopatra Selene became estranged from Antiochus XIII at some point before 75 BC and declared Seleucus VII as her co-ruler. (Note: Burgess suggested that Cleopatra Selene minted coinage in the names of both Antiochus XIII and his brother. Such a scenario is unprecedented in Seleucid history. Since "Philometor" appears on Kritt's coin, which is the same epithet borne by Antiochus XIII under the regency of his mother, then it is almost certain that Kritt's coin also belonged to Antiochus XIII.)

== Ancestry ==
Ptolemy V Epiphanes	Cleopatra I Syra
Ptolemy VI Philometor	Cleopatra II
Ptolemy VIII Physcon	Cleopatra III
Cleopatra Selene of Syria

== See also ==
- List of Syrian monarchs
- Timeline of Syrian history

== Notes ==
Cleopatra Selene of Syria Ptolemaic dynasty Born: c. 135–130 BC Died: 69 BC
Royal titles
Preceded by Cleopatra IV	Queen consort of Egypt; 115–107 BC; 107–102 BC	Succeeded by Pharaoh Berenice III (as King's wife)
Preceded by Tryphaena	Queen consort of Syria; 102–96 BC; 95 BC; 95–92 BC	Succeeded by Uncertain
Regnal titles
Preceded by Antiochus XII; Philip I	Queen regnant of Syria; 82–69 BC with Philip I (82–75 BC); Antiochus XIII (82–69 BC)	Succeeded by Antiochus XIII
