= Cleopatra III =

Ptolemaic Queen of Egypt from 142 to 131 BC and again from 127 to 116 BC

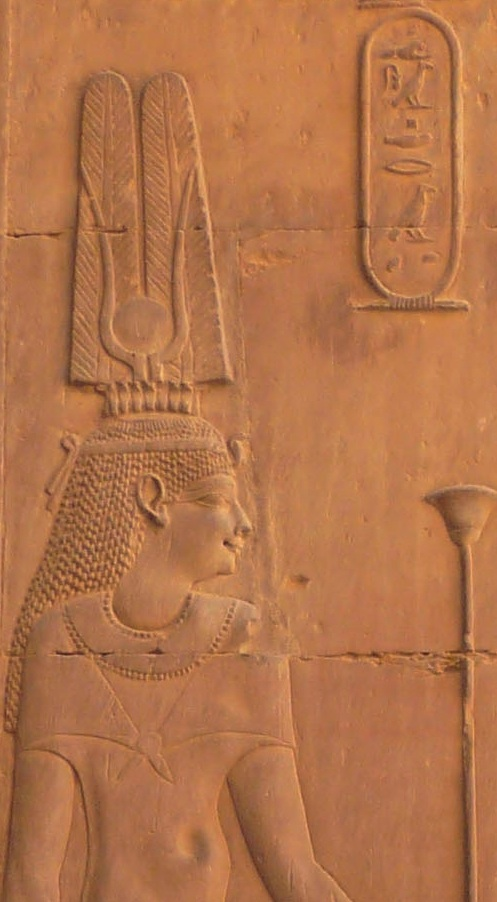
- Cleopatra III at Kom Ombo

Pharaoh and Queen of the Ptolemaic Kingdom
- Reign: First reign, 142—131 BC; Second reign, 127–101 BC
- Coregency: Ptolemy VIII and Cleopatra II (first reign); Ptolemy VIII (127–116 BC); Cleopatra II (124–116 BC); Ptolemy IX (116–107 BC); Ptolemy X (107–101 BC) (second reign)
- Predecessor: Ptolemy VIII and Cleopatra II (first reign); Cleopatra II (second reign)
- Successor: Cleopatra II (first reign); Ptolemy X and Berenice III (second reign)
Royal titulary
Horus name
Nebtaoui Kanekhet
Lady of the Two Lands, Mighty Bull
G5	N6 t H8 E1 D36 V30 N16 N16
- Consorts: Ptolemy VIII of Egypt (uncle and step-father)
- Children: Ptolemy IX, King of Egypt; Ptolemy X, King of Egypt; Cleopatra IV, Queen of Egypt; Cleopatra Selene, Queen of Syria; Tryphaena, Queen of Syria
- Father: Ptolemy VI of Egypt
- Mother: Cleopatra II of Egypt
- Born: c. 160 – 155 BC
- Died: 101 BC
- Dynasty: Ptolemaic dynasty

Cleopatra III (Ancient Greek: Κλεοπάτρα; c.160–101 BC) was a queen of Egypt. She ruled at first with her mother Cleopatra II and husband Ptolemy VIII from 142 to 131 BC and again from 127 to 116 BC. She then ruled with her sons Ptolemy IX and Ptolemy X from 116 to 101 BC.

Cleopatra III was also known as Cleopatra Euergetis (Εὐεργέτις) while associated with her husband Ptolemy VIII or her son Ptolemy X. She is attested as Cleopatra Philometor Soteira (Φιλομήτωρ Σώτειρα) while associated with her eldest son Ptolemy IX. According to Strabo, she was sometimes known as Kokke (Κόκκη) when discussed in relation to her son Ptolemy X.

== Life ==
The cartouche of Cleopatra III from the Temple of Kom Ombo.

Cleopatra III's uncle Ptolemy VIII ruled together with her parents from ca 170 BC to 164 BC, at which point he expelled Cleopatra II and Ptolemy VI. However, he was soon forced to abdicate in 163 BC.

Cleopatra III's parents retook the throne and remained in power for almost 20 years until 145 BC. Cleopatra III was born between 160 and 155 BC. She was a sister to Ptolemy Eupator, Cleopatra Thea, Ptolemy VII Neos Philopator, and possibly Berenice.

Ptolemy VI died in 145 BC from injuries sustained when falling from his horse during the battle of Oinoparas against Alexander Balas. Cleopatra III's uncle Ptolemy VIII became the King of Egypt again.

=== Joint rule with her mother and husband ===
Ptolemy VIII first married Cleopatra III's mother Cleopatra II in 145 BC, and married Cleopatra III in c. 139 BC.

Cleopatra II rebelled against Ptolemy VIII in c. 132 BC and Cleopatra III fled to Cyprus in 130 BC with her husband, but was able to return to Alexandria in 127 BC. In c. 124 BC Cleopatra III and her husband were joined again by her mother Cleopatra II as a joint ruler.

=== Joint rule with her sons ===
After the death of Ptolemy VIII in 116 BC Cleopatra III ruled jointly with her mother Cleopatra II and her son Ptolemy IX. Her mother died late into the same year or early into the next year (115 BC).

Cleopatra III expelled Ptolemy IX from Alexandria in 107 BC and replaced him as co-regent with her second son Ptolemy X. After 6 years of joint rule Ptolemy X had his mother Cleopatra III murdered in 101 BC. Cleopatra III was succeeded by Ptolemy X, possibly in joint rule with his wife Berenice III, who was Cleopatra III's granddaughter.

== Issue ==
Cleopatra III and Ptolemy VIII married in 142 or 141 BC and had five children:

Name	Image	Birth	Death	Notes
Ptolemy IX Soter		142 BC	December 81 BC	Co-ruler of Egypt alongside his mother and grandmother from 116 to 107 BC, when he was exiled to Cyprus, then sole ruler from 88 to 81 BC.
Ptolemy X Alexander		140 BC?	88–87 BC	King of Cyprus from 114 to 107 BC, when he became co-ruler of Egypt alongside his mother, until expelled in 88 BC.
Tryphaena		c. 140 BC	110/09 BC	Married the Seleucid king Antiochus VIII Grypus in 124 BC.
Cleopatra IV		138–135 BC?	112 BC	Married to Ptolemy IX and co-ruler with him from 116 to 115 BC, when she was divorced from him and remarried to the Seleucid king Antiochus IX Cyzicenus.
Cleopatra Selene		135–130 BC?	69 BC	Married to Ptolemy IX from 115 BC until probably 107 BC, when she was possibly remarried to Ptolemy X. Then married in succession to the Seleucid kings Antiochus VIII, Antiochus IX, and Antiochus X.

Cleopatra III Ptolemaic dynasty Born: ca. 160 – 155 BC Died: 101 BC
Regnal titles
Preceded by Ptolemy VIII and Cleopatra II	Queen of Egypt; 142 BC–131 BC with Ptolemy VIII and Cleopatra II	Succeeded by Cleopatra II
Preceded by Cleopatra II	Queen of Egypt; 127 BC–101 BC with Ptolemy VIII, Cleopatra II, Ptolemy IX and Ptolemy X	Succeeded by Ptolemy X and Berenice III
