= Ptolemy X Alexander I =

Ptolemaic King of Egypt, 107–88 BC

- Ptolemy Philometor Soter (109–101 BC); Ptolemy Philadelphus (101–88 BC)
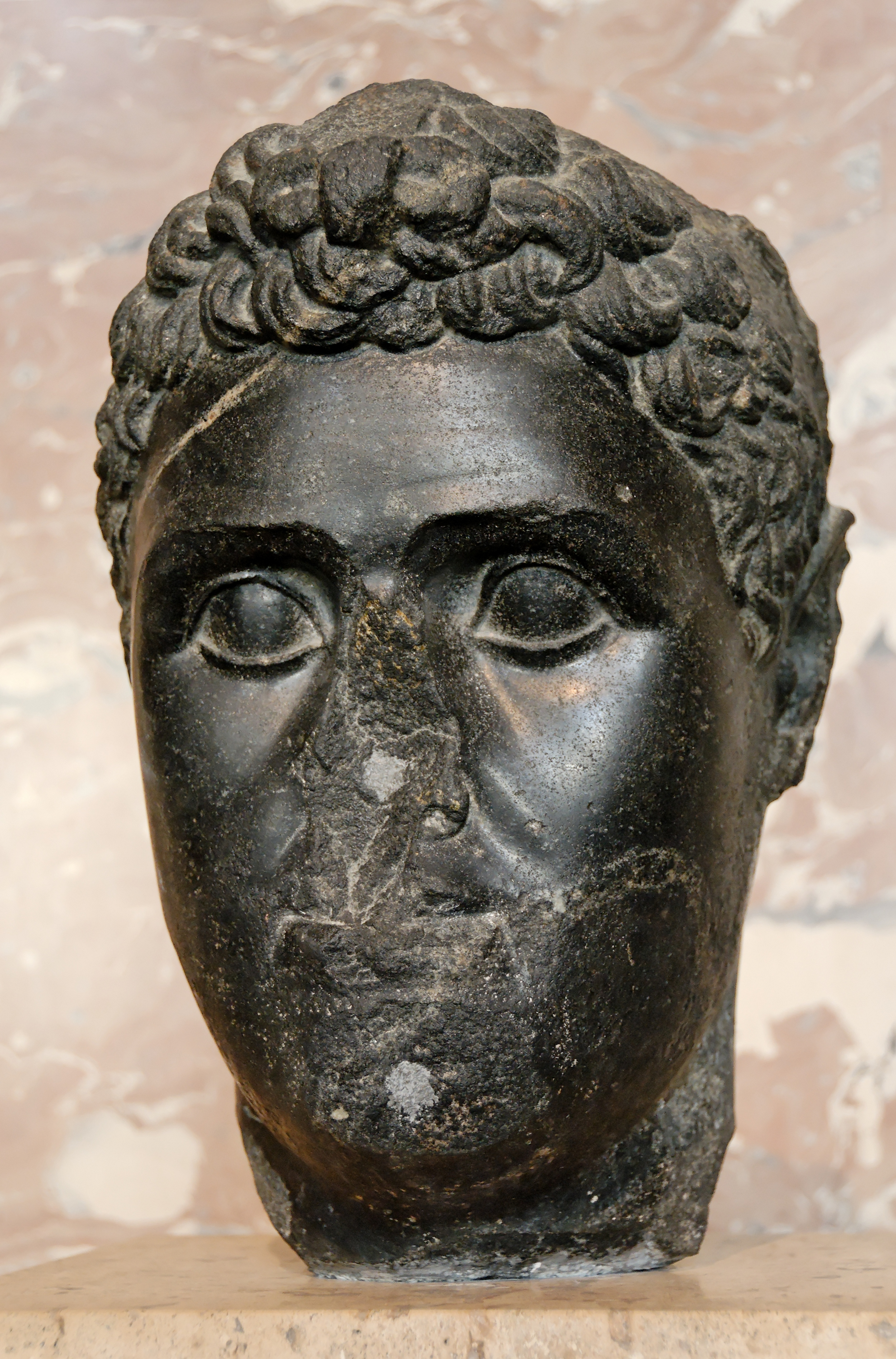
- Bust, Louvre

Pharaoh and King of the Ptolemaic Kingdom
- Reign: 107–88 BC with Cleopatra III (until 101 BC) with Berenice III (after 101 BC)
- Predecessor: Ptolemy IX Soter
- Successor: Berenice III
Royal titulary
Horus name
nṯrj-m-ẖt ẖnm.n-sw-ḥpw-Ꜥnḫ-ḥr-msḫn(t) ḥwnw-nfr bnr-mrwt sḫꜤj.n-sw-mwt.f-ḥr-nst-jt.f ṯmꜢ-Ꜥḥwj-ḫꜢswt jṯj-m-sḫm.f-mj-rꜤ-psḏ.f-m-Ꜣḫt
Netjeriemkhet Khnumensuhapuankhhermeskhen(et) Hununeferbenermerutsekhaensumutefhernesetitef Tjema'ahuikhasut Itjemsekhemefmirepesdjefemakhet
Godlike in his mother's love, associated with the living Apis upon his birth, the perfect youth, pleasant in his popularity,
who his mother placed upon the throne of his father, who is strong in strategy, who defeats foreign lands, who lights up the horizon with his conquering power like Ra.
G5	C20 M X n z Aa5 p anx E1 D2 Z1 ms s x nw N37 N37 H wn n nw W A17 nfr M30 N36 t z xa n z t G14 f D2 g t f f U5 Z1 a D40 N25 t Z3 V15 Aa15 sxm m f N6 Z1 mi Dd N8 f Aa15 N27 t O1
Nebty name
shrw-tꜢwi kꜢ-nḫt sḫm-nḥḥ
Seherutawy Kanakht Sekhemneneh
Who pleases the Two Lands, the strong bull, eternal power
G16	z O4 r ib wAD E1 Z9 D40 sxm N37 H ra H
Golden Horus
ꜤꜢ-ib mri-nṯrw ity-bꜢḳt ḥḳꜢ-wꜢḏti Ꜥḳ.f-tꜢmri-m-ḥtp
A'a-ib Merynetjeru Itibaqet Heqawadjty Aqeftameryemhotep
The great-hearted one who is beloved of the Gods, Master of Baqet and ruler of the two crowns, when he enters The Beloved Land in peace
G8	O29 ib Z1 Z1 nTr Z1 nTr Z1 nTr N36 D10 t niwt i U33 i i A23 HqA t y M14 I12 I12 Aa15 f f N17 O5 t niwt Aa15 Htp t p
Prenomen
iwꜤ-(n)-nṯr-mnḫ-nṯrt-mnḫt-rꜤ stp-n-ptḥ iri-mꜢꜤt-rꜤ znn-Ꜥnḫ-n-jmn
Iwa(en)netjermenekhenetjeretmenkhetre Setepenptah Irimaatre Senenankhenamun
Heir of the potent god and of the potent goddess, the daughter of Ra, chosen by Ptah, who has accomplished the Maat of Ra, the living likeness of Amun

M23 X1 L2 X1	mnx nTr t H8 nTr N6 t H8 F44 p t H stp n ir Aa11 C2 C12 z sw sw A53 anx S3
Nomen
ptlwmis ḏd n.f Ꜥlksntrs Ꜥnḫ-ḏt mri-ptḥ
Petulemis Djed Enef Aleksentres Ankhdjetmeryptah
Ptolemaios, also called Alexandros, living forever, beloved of Ptah

G39 N5	p t wA l M i i s D&t f n f r i k z n t r z anx D&t&N17 p t H N36
- Consorts: Cleopatra Selene; Berenice III
- Children: Ptolemy XI; Cleopatra V
- Father: Ptolemy VIII
- Mother: Cleopatra III
- Born: 140/139 BC?
- Died: 88 or 87 BC
- Dynasty: Ptolemaic dynasty

Ptolemy X Alexander I (Note: Numbering the Ptolemies is a modern convention. Older sources may give a number one higher or lower. The most reliable way of determining which Ptolemy is being referred to in any given case is by epithet (e.g. "Philopator").) (Greek: Πτολεμαῖος Ἀλέξανδρος, Ptolemaĩos Aléxandros) was the Ptolemaic king of Cyprus from 114 BC until 107 BC and of Egypt from 107 BC until his death in 88 BC. He ruled in co-regency with his mother Cleopatra III as Ptolemy Philometor Soter (Note: lit. "Ptolemy, mother-loving savior") until 101 BC, and then with his niece and wife Berenice III as Ptolemy Philadelphus. (Note: lit. "Ptolemy, sibling-lover") He was a son of Ptolemy VIII and Cleopatra III, and younger brother of Ptolemy IX. His birth name was probably Alexander.

Ptolemy X was the second son of Ptolemy VIII and Cleopatra III. When Ptolemy VIII died in 116 BC, Ptolemy IX became king with Cleopatra III as his co-regent and Alexander was sent to Cyprus to serve as governor. However, in 114–113 BC, he declared himself king. Cleopatra III quarrelled with Ptolemy IX and arranged for Alexander to return to Egypt in 107 BC and replace his brother as co-regent (with modern sources calling him Ptolemy X).

During his reign, Ptolemy X had to fight against his brother Ptolemy IX to maintain control over the Egyptian throne. Cleopatra III and Ptolemy X fought a war against Ptolemy IX in the Hasmonean kingdom (103–102 BC), in which Ptolemy X prevented his brother from invading Egypt. In 101 BC, he had his mother murdered, married his niece Berenice III, and appointed his new wife as co-regent. An Egyptian uprising in 91 BC caused Ptolemy X to lose control of the south of the country. In 88 BC, the people expelled him from Alexandria, recalling Ptolemy IX to the throne. Ptolemy X raised an army with Roman help and invaded Cyprus, but was killed.

== Background and early life ==
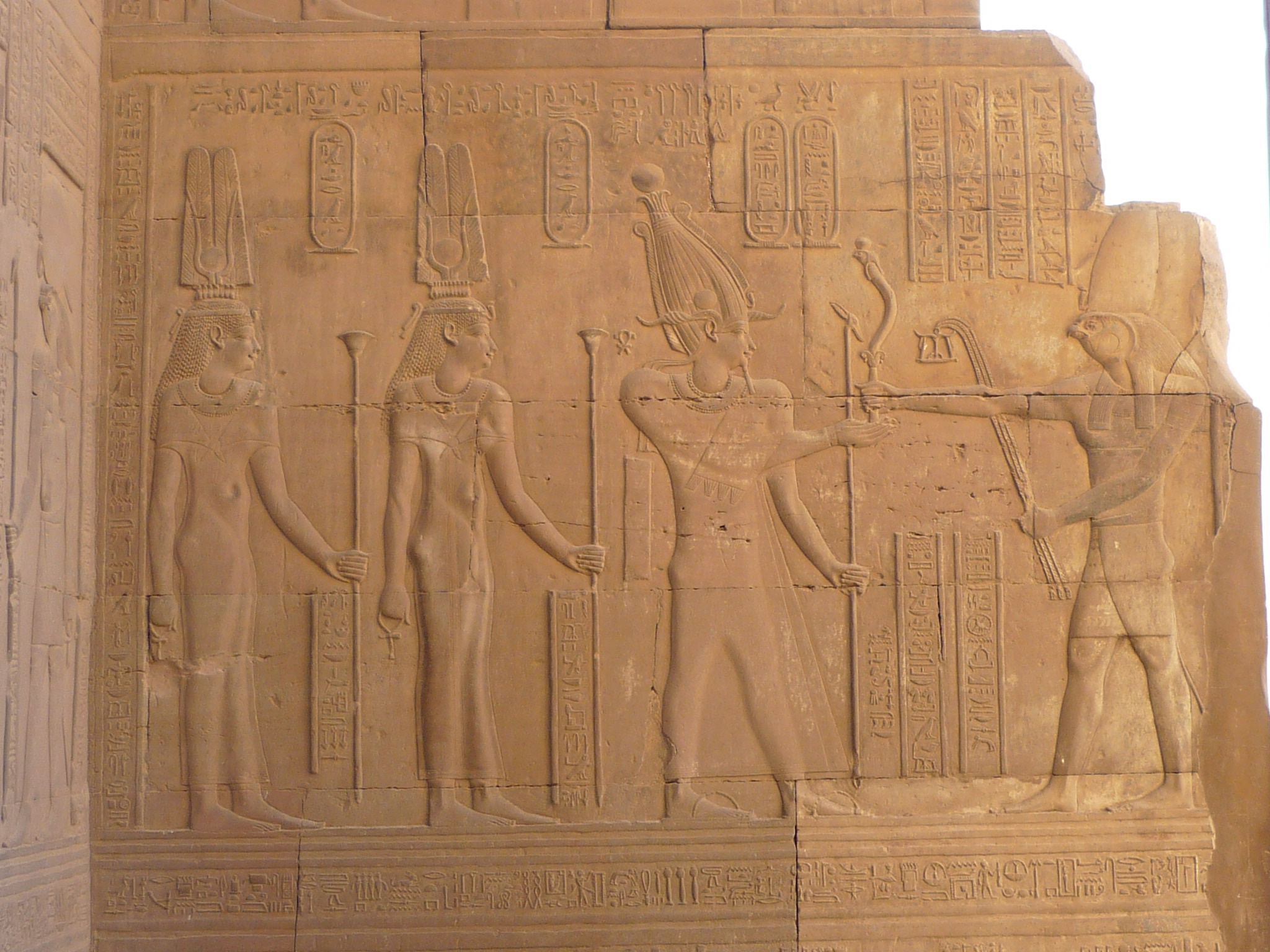
Wall relief of Cleopatra III, her mother Cleopatra II and Ptolemy VIII before Horus at Kom Ombo

Ptolemy X, born Alexander, was a member of the Greek Ptolemaic dynasty of Egypt. When King Ptolemy V had died in 180 BC, he had left three children: Ptolemy VI, Cleopatra II, and Ptolemy VIII. All three ruled together from 169 BC until 164 BC, when Ptolemy VIII expelled his brother from power. In 163 BC, he was expelled in turn and forced to withdraw to Cyrene. However, when Ptolemy VI died in 145 BC, Ptolemy VIII was invited back to Egypt to serve as king, marrying his sister Cleopatra II (who had previously been married to Ptolemy VI). The relationship between Ptolemy VIII and Cleopatra II rapidly deteriorated, especially when Ptolemy VIII took Cleopatra III, the daughter of Ptolemy VI and Cleopatra II), as a second wife. The conflict eventually led to a civil war with Cleopatra II on one side and Ptolemy VIII and Cleopatra III on the other (132–126 BC). Ptolemy VIII and Cleopatra III were victorious, but reconciled with Cleopatra II and restored her as co-regent in 124 BC.

Ptolemy VIII and Cleopatra III had two sons and three daughters. The eldest son was Ptolemy IX, who was born around 144–143 BC and became the heir to the throne c. 130 BC, during the civil war with Cleopatra II. Their second son, known as Ptolemy X, was born around 140 BC – it is possible that the Horus name that he later assumed indicates that he was born in 140–139 BC. He is referred to as Ptolemy Alexander in a number of ancient sources, but never in documentary sources like papyri. It is likely that Alexander was his birth name.

== Governor and king of Cyprus (116–107 BC) ==
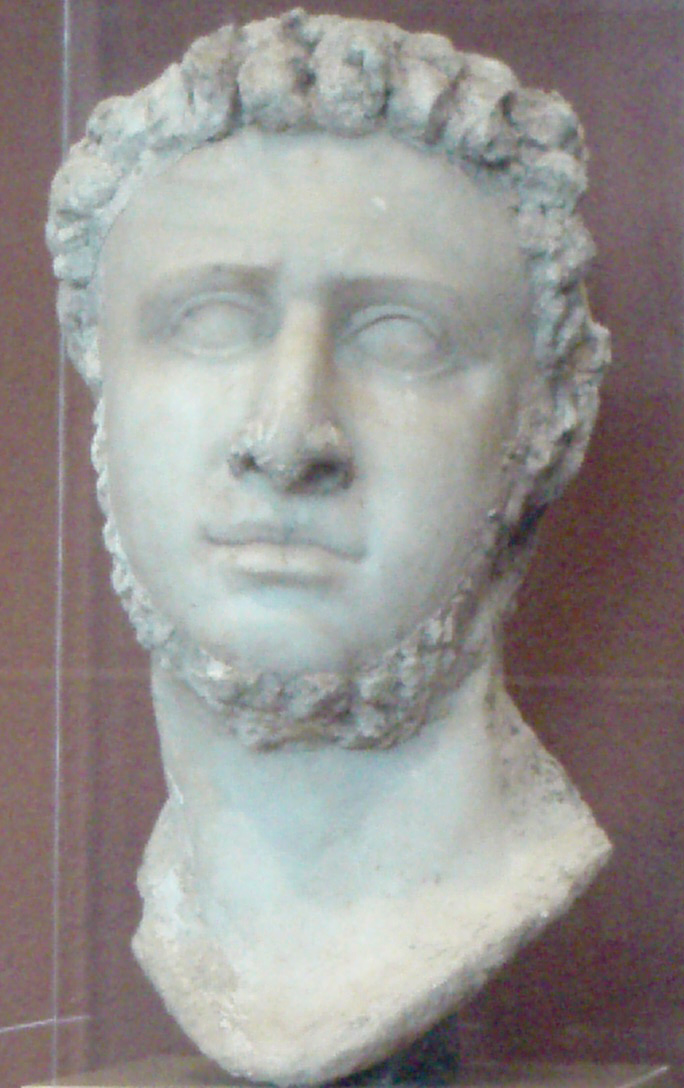
Probable bust of Ptolemy IX

On 28 June 116, Ptolemy VIII died. According to Justin, Ptolemy VIII's will left Cleopatra III in charge of Egypt, with the right to choose either her elder son, Ptolemy, or her younger son, Alexander, as her co-regent. Justin further claims that Cleopatra III wanted to choose Alexander, but the people of Alexandria rioted and forced her to choose Ptolemy. Pausanias implies that Cleopatra III's request to send Ptolemy IX to Cyprus in 117 BC had been intended to get him out of the way in order to enable Ptolemy X's succession. Some historians have found this account plausible. Others have argued that it was invented by Cleopatra III at a later date. At any rate, Cleopatra II, Cleopatra III, and Ptolemy IX became the co-rulers of Egypt. They are listed together (in that order) as co-rulers in surviving papyrus documents from October 116 BC. Meanwhile, Alexander was sent to Cyprus to serve as governor.

Cleopatra II died some time before April 115 BC and at this point Cleopatra III became the dominant force in the government of Egypt. Ptolemy IX was forced to divorce his sister-wife Cleopatra IV, who went off and married the Seleucid king Antiochus IX (r. 115–95 BC), whose mother Cleopatra Thea was Cleopatra III's sister. Her new husband was waging a war against his half-brother Antiochus VIII (r. 125–96 BC), who was married to Cleopatra IV's elder sister Tryphaena. On the way to meet Antiochus IX, Cleopatra IV stopped in Cyprus, where she recruited an army and seized control of the Cypriot fleet, to aid Antiochus IX. Perhaps as a result of this, in 114–113 BC, Alexander proclaimed himself 'King of Cyprus', openly declaring his opposition to Ptolemy IX.

In autumn 107 BC, a new conflict broke out between Cleopatra III and Ptolemy IX. Pausanias claims that Cleopatra III wounded a number of her own eunuch servants and displayed them to the people as evidence that her son had attempted to have her assassinated, causing the Alexandrians to riot and expel Ptolemy IX from the city.

== King of Egypt (107–88 BC) ==
=== Accession ===
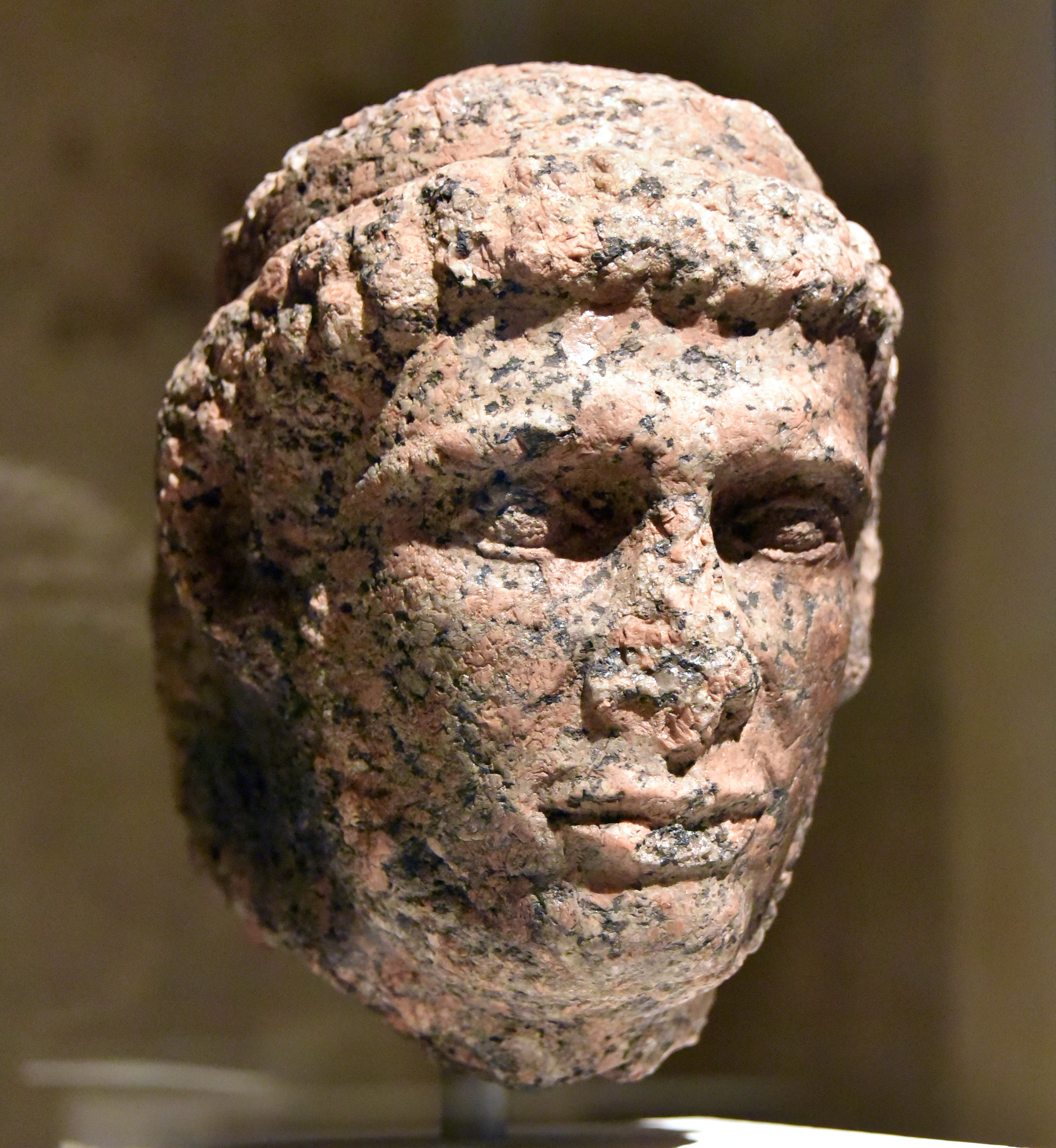
Head of Ptolemy X, from Egypt, Ptolemaic period, 2nd century BC. Neues Museum, Germany

While this conflict was taking place, Alexander had left Cyprus and sailed to Pelusium. Cleopatra III had him brought to Alexandria and placed on the throne as her new co-regent in September 107 BC. Cleopatra III seems to have dominated the new government even more thoroughly than she had during the reign of Ptolemy IX. Because of the means by which he came to the throne, he was given the derisory nickname Pareisactus (Greek: παρείσακτος, pareísaktos, "smuggled in"). Another nickname given to him ho Cocces (the son of Cocce), seems to refer to his mother's dominance, but the exact meaning of the name thereby given to his mother, Cocce, is unclear. It may mean cuckoo, in which case this nickname too refers to the way in which his mother had brought him to the kingship. Other interpretations are 'son of the scarlet lady' or 'son of the cunt'. In general, Ptolemy X was slotted into the role that his brother had previously held. He married his brother's wife, Cleopatra Selene, who was also his sister. He assumed the epithet that had previously been borne by his brother, Philometor Soter (Mother-loving Saviour) and took his brother's place in the dynastic cult, in which he and his mother were worshipped as the Theoi Philometores Soteres (Mother-loving Saviour Gods). Ptolemy X served as the annual Priest of Alexander and the Ptolemies for 107–106 BC and 106–105 BC – as his brother had for every year since 116 BC. In 105–104 BC, Cleopatra III assumed the priesthood for herself.

=== War with Ptolemy IX and intervention in Judaea ===
After his expulsion from Alexandria, Ptolemy IX had gone to Cyprus. Forces loyal to Cleopatra III and Ptolemy X expelled him, but he mounted another invasion of Cyprus in 106 BC, which succeeded in conquering the island. Cyrene had initially remained under Ptolemy IX's control, but some time after 105 BC and before 100 BC, a third brother, Ptolemy Apion gained control of the region. Justin claims that the territory had originally been left to Apion in Ptolemy VIII's will, but it is not clear whether this was true or a post facto invention. It is unclear whether Apion was aligned with either Ptolemy IX or Ptolemy X. One sign that he was a free agent may be the will which he published. This will left all his territories to Rome in the event that he died without heirs, a method which was often used by Hellenistic kings to prevent rivals from attempting to depose or assassinate them. He actually did die without heirs in 96 BC, meaning that Rome inherited the territory.

In 103 BC, the new Hasmonean king of Judaea, Alexander Jannaeus, attacked Ptolemais Akko. Ptolemy IX responded by invading Judaea. Fearing that Ptolemy IX was planning to use Judaea as a springboard for an invasion of Egypt, Cleopatra III and Ptolemy X invaded Judaea themselves. Ptolemy X invaded Phoenicia by sea and then marched inland to Damascus, while Cleopatra III besieged Ptolemais Akko. Ptolemy IX attempted to slip past them and into Egypt, but Ptolemy X managed to rush back and stop him. Ptolemy IX spent the winter encamped at Gaza, before deciding to sail back to Cyprus in early 102 BC. During this conflict, Cleopatra III and Ptolemy X made an alliance with the Seleucid king Antiochus VIII. He was still waging his own civil war against his brother Antiochus IX, who had previously received support from Ptolemy IX. To seal the alliance with Antiochus VIII, Cleopatra forced Ptolemy X to divorce his sister-wife, Cleopatra Selene, and remarried her to Antiochus.

=== Reign with Berenice III ===
In September 101 BC, Cleopatra disappears from official documents. Justin reports that Ptolemy X had her murdered, when he realised that she was intending to kill him. In October of the same year, Ptolemy married his niece Berenice III, daughter of Ptolemy IX and Cleopatra Selene and appointed her co-regent. Ptolemy X changed his own epithet to Philadelphos (Sibling-lover) and the couple were brought into the dynastic cult as the Theoi Philadelphoi (Sibling-loving gods).

In 91 BC, a rebellion broke out in Upper Egypt. This rebellion was the latest in a series of native Egyptian uprisings in the region, following those of Horwennefer (205–185 BC) and Harsiesi (131–130 BC). It is unknown what the name of the rebellion's leader was or whether he claimed the title of Pharaoh, as earlier rebel leaders had. The rebels gained control of Thebes and were supported by the Theban priests. Their forces are also attested in Latopolis and Pathyris. The rebellion also meant that the Ptolemies lost contact with the Triakontaschoinos region (Lower Nubia). Meroë took control of the region and retained it until the Roman period.

Around May 88 BC, Alexandrians and the army turned against Ptolemy X and expelled him. Porphyry reports that the rebellion was a result of anger at Ptolemy's friendliness with the Jews. Strabo says that Ptolemy X was expelled because he melted down the golden sarcophagus of Alexander the Great and replaced it with one made of glass. The Alexandrians invited Ptolemy IX to return to Alexandria and retake the throne, which he did. Ptolemy X and Berenice gathered a naval force to recapture the kingdom, but were defeated in battle. Ptolemy X recruited a second force at Myra, invaded Cyprus, and was killed.

In the process of recruiting this final force, Ptolemy X had taken out a loan from the Roman Republic. It seems that providing collateral for this loan involved producing a will, which left Egypt to the Roman Republic in the event of his death without an heir. The Romans chose not to take advantage of this will after Ptolemy's death, but did not outright reject it, either. The possibility of Roman intervention hung over Ptolemy IX for the rest of his reign and forced him to adopt a highly deferential posture with the Romans.

== Marriage and issue ==
Ptolemy X probably married his sister Cleopatra Selene on taking the throne in 109 BC. She had previously been married to Ptolemy IX. They probably had one son, Ptolemy XI before she was remarried to Antiochus VIII in 103/102 BC. After he murdered Cleopatra III, Ptolemy X married Berenice III, who was probably the daughter of Ptolemy IX and Cleopatra Selene (thus, Ptolemy X's step-daughter and niece), in October 101 BC. They probably had one daughter, Cleopatra V.

Name	Image	Birth	Death	Notes
Ptolemy XI		c. 105 BC	April 80 BC	Co-regent with his stepmother/wife Berenice III for a few days in April 80 BC.
Cleopatra V		c. 100–95 BC	57 BC	Married her cousin Ptolemy XII and co-regent with him from 79–69 BC, co-regent with her daughter Berenice IV 58–57 BC.

== Ancestry ==
Ancestors of Ptolemy X Alexander I

8. Ptolemy IV Philopator
4. Ptolemy V Epiphanes
9. Arsinoe III of Egypt
2. Ptolemy VIII Physcon
10. Antiochus III the Great
5. Cleopatra I of Egypt
11. Laodice III
1. Ptolemy IX Lathyros
12. =4. Ptolemy V Epiphanes
6. Ptolemy VI Philometor
13. =5. Cleopatra I of Egypt
3. Cleopatra III of Egypt
14. =4/12. Ptolemy V Epiphanes
7. Cleopatra II of Egypt
15. =5/13. Cleopatra I of Egypt

== Bibliography ==
- Hölbl, Günther (2001). A History of the Ptolemaic Empire. London & New York: Routledge. pp. 143–152 & 181–194. ISBN 0415201454.

Ptolemy X Alexander I Ptolemaic dynasty Born: ? Died: c. 88 BC
Regnal titles
Preceded by Ptolemy IX	Pharaoh of Egypt; 110–109 BC with Cleopatra III	Succeeded by Ptolemy IX
Preceded by Ptolemy IX	Pharaoh of Egypt; 107–88 BC with Cleopatra III and Berenice III	Succeeded by Ptolemy IX
