= Apollonia Senmothis =

Apollonia Senmothis (in some sources also named Senmonthis) (circa 170 BC – floruit 126 BC), was a Greek-Egyptian businesswoman.

== Life ==
She was the daughter of the cavalry officer Ptolemaios Pamenos, and married the cavalry officer Dryton from Crete at the age of twenty in 150 BC. She had five daughters. Both her father and husband were ethnically Greeks in service of the Ptolemaic dynasty, but her father and his family were culturally Egyptian, and she had been given an Egyptian upbringing. She referred to herself under her Egyptian name in private, and to her Greek name in public. She lived in Pathyris.

Apollonia Senmothis became a successful businesswoman with an important position in business life. She invested in the wheat, barley and spelt trade and participated in banking. There was a noted difference in business documents and contracts she made with Egyptians, and those she signed at Greek notaries: as an Egyptian woman, she was equal to a man and signed her own documents without the interference of her husband, but as a Greek woman, she was nominally under the guardianship of her husband and her contracts was witnessed by her husband, even if this appears to have been a mere formality.

Apollonia Senmothis has left an archive of her business transactions and documents from 145 to 126 BC in the Dryton and Apollonia Archive, which are regarded as an important source of historical research.

== See also ==
- Horos son of Nechoutes
- Ptolemaios son of Glaucias

== Bibliography ==
- Katelijn Vandorpe, A Companion to Greco-Roman and Late Antique Egypt
- Vandorpe, Katelijn: Apollonia, a businesswoman in a multicultural society (Pathyris, 2nd-1st centuries B.C.), Le rôle et le statut de la femme en Égypte hellénistique, romaine et byzantine / Ed. par Henri Melaerts et Leon Mooren.; 2002; pp. 325 - 336
- Sharon L. James, Sheila Dillon, A Companion to Women in the Ancient World
