= Ptolemaios son of Glaukias =

Ancient Egyptian hermit

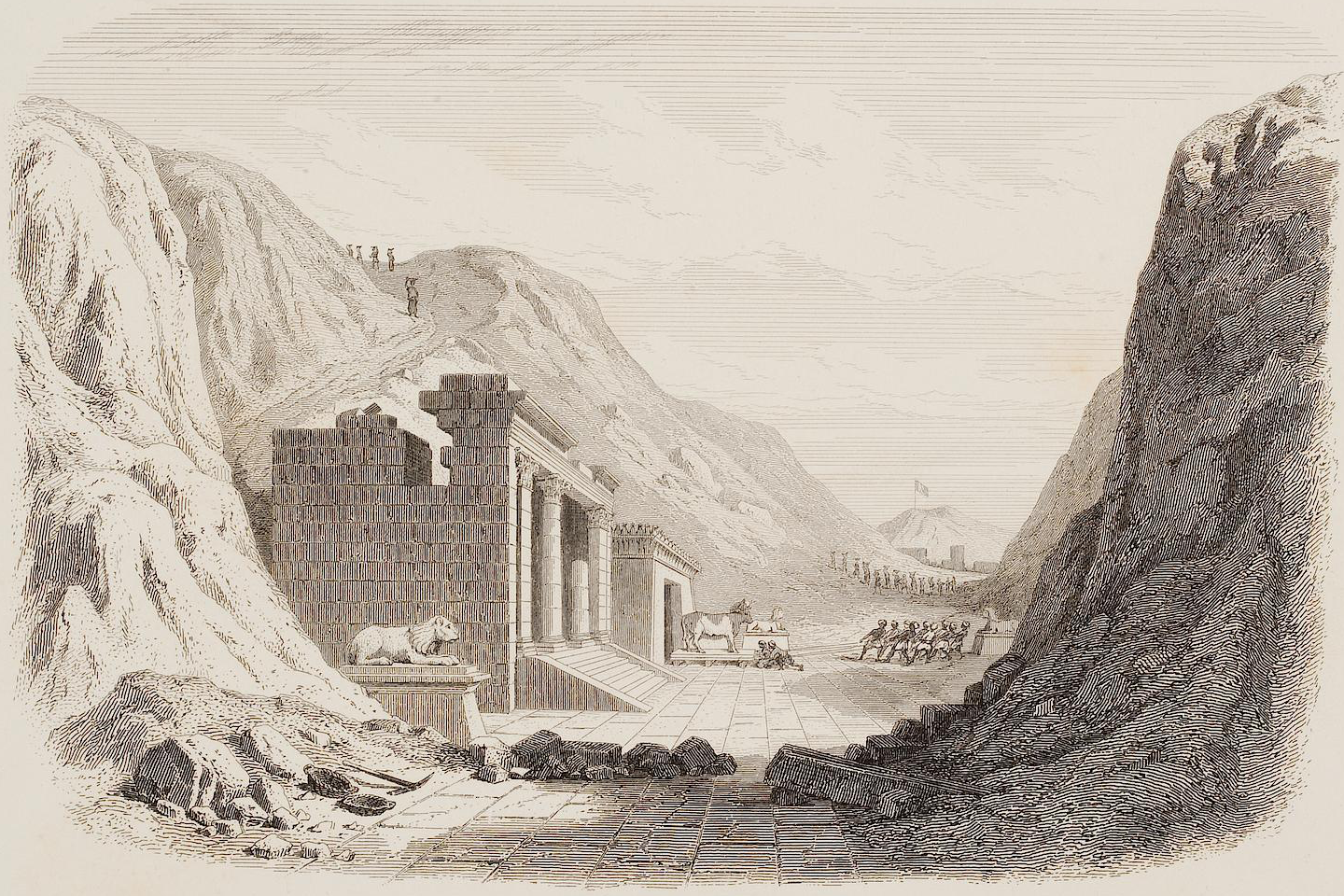
A chapel at the Serapeum of Saqqara, like the one in which Ptolemaios lived in katoche for 20 years

Ptolemaios son of Glaukias (Ancient Greek: Πτολεμαῖος Γλαυκίου Μακεδών, romanized: Ptolemaios Glaukiou Makedon, c. 200 BC – after 152 BC) was a katochos (an unclear word roughly translatable as hermit) who lived in the Temple of Astarte in the Serapeum at Memphis, Egypt for 20 years. Many details about his life and associates, such as his younger brother Apollonios and the two twins under his care, are known thanks to the survival of an extensive archive of papyri belonging to the katochoi of the temple.

== Katoche ==
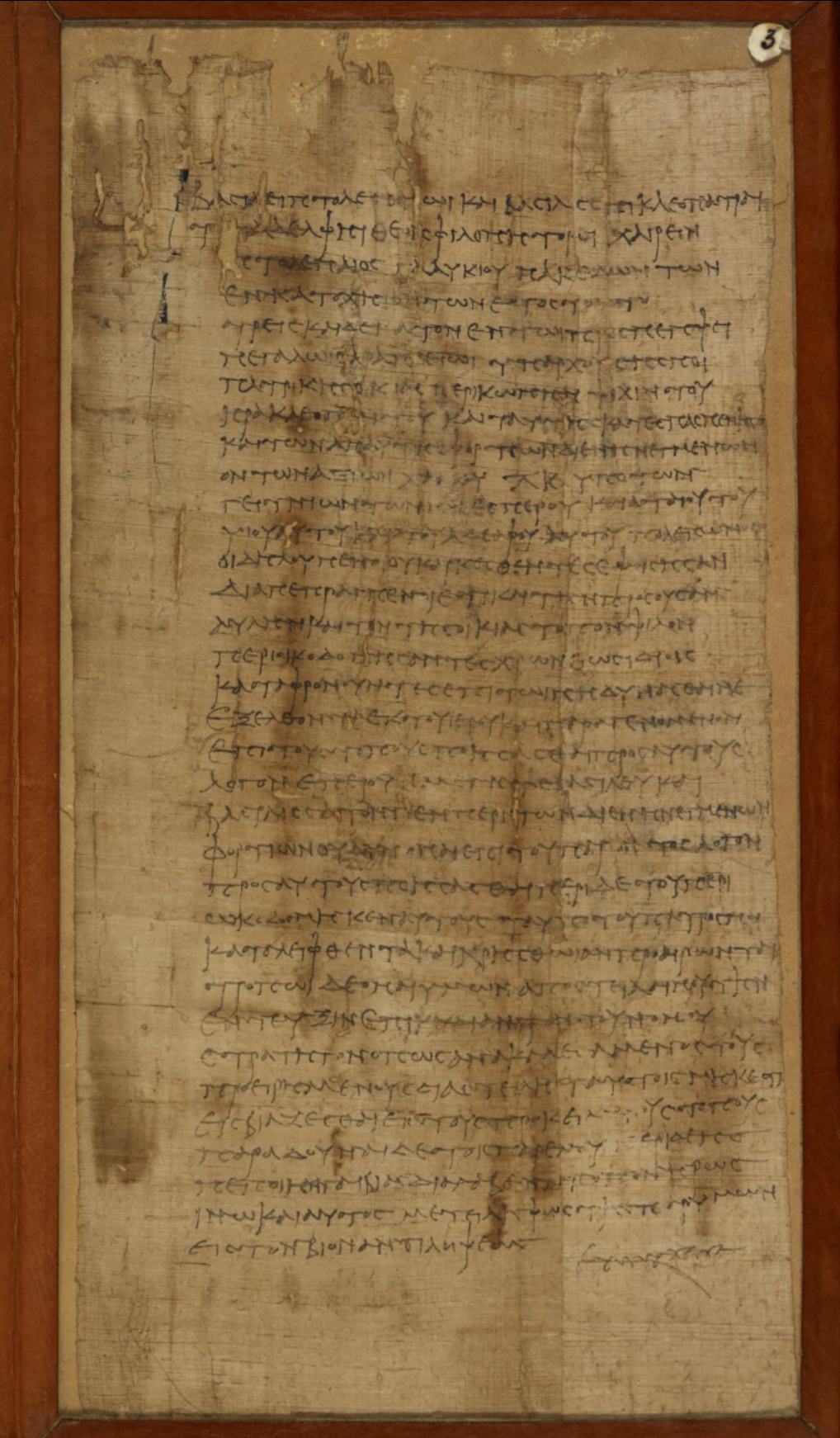
A petition written by Ptolemaios to Ptolemy VI Philometor and Cleopatra II. A transcription and translation of it can be read here

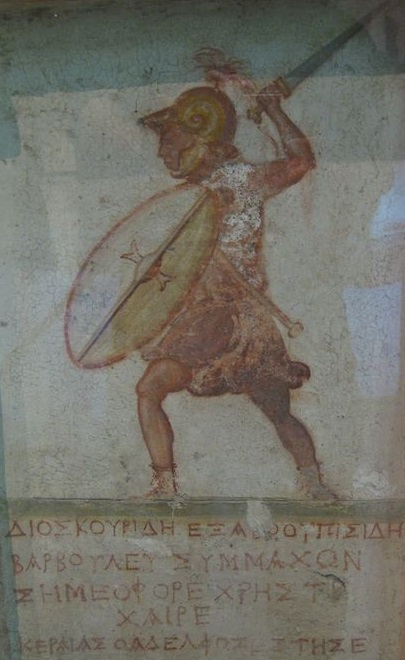
A Ptolemaic soldier from a stele dated 2nd century BC

Ptolemaios was likely born before 200 BC, as he mentions having grey hairs in 159 BC. He was the eldest of four sons of a certain Glaukias, a Macedonian lot-holder at the village of Psichis in the Heracleopolite nome, with his brothers being Hippalos, Sarapion and Apollonios. Around October 172 BC, he moved to the Serapeum of Memphis as a katochos in the Temple of Astarte, after being commanded to do so by Serapis in a dream or prophecy. The meaning of katochos is unclear, but it entailed a strict restriction against leaving the temple. Glaukias was killed at Psichis in 164 BC, possibly by rebels.

From February to September 158 BC, Ptolemaios was briefly joined in katoche by his adolescent brother Apollonios, whom he taught to read and write in Greek and Egyptian. Apollonios' misspellings in Greek reveal that he spoke it with an Egyptian accent, indicating that his first language was Egyptian. Unlike Ptolemaios, Apollonios was fiery and rebellious, as demonstrated by his conflict with a local shopkeeper's sons. He held unconventional views on the gods that at times bordered on atheism, in sharp contrast with his deeply religious brother. On 3 October 158 BC, Ptolemaios successfully appealed to Ptolemy VI Philometor to have Apollonios enrolled the Ptolemaic army. However, as Apollonios' position there was seemingly unpaid, he supplemented his income by becoming a police informant.

Ptolemaios also had custody of three Egyptian girls who lived in asylia in the temple: the twins Thages and Thaous (also known as Tawê and Taous) and their probable sister Tathemis. According to several petitions written by Ptolemaios in their defense, the twins' mother Nephoris left their father, who was a friend of Ptolemaios, and went to live with a Greek soldier in Memphis named Philippos. She then ordered Philippos to kill the twins' father with a knife. Their father fled from the attack but died soon afterwards from the injuries. Their mother took possession of his property, forcing the twins to flee to the temple. There they performed the sacred funerary rites of the Apis bull, for which a pair of twins was ritually necessary to play the roles of Isis and Nephthys. As priestesses, they were entitled to an allowance (syntaxis) of oil and bread, but this was swindled by their half-brother Pakhrates. With Ptolemaios' help, the twins successfully sued Nephoris and Pakhrates, and had their stolen property returned to them.

Ptolemaios earned a modest living by trading in textiles and in a type of porridge (Greek: ἀθήρα), as well as by managing finances for third parties. He often had to sell his possessions (and, on one occasion, a cow) to make ends meet. During the last two years spanned by the archive, he received a meagre allowance of 100 drachmae per month from the temple authorities. He relied on an Egyptian agent and fellow katochos, Harmais, and on two therapeutae, Diphilos and Nikanor, who were able to leave the temple area unlike the katochoi. Much of his income was spent on those whom he was responsible for, especially the twins, about whom he seemed to constantly worry. Ptolemaios was constantly working and reworking his accounts, and was seemingly so obsessed with numbers and totals that he often dreamed about them.

Ptolemaios wrote numerous petitions to various officials during his katoche, including Ptolemy VI Philometor and Cleopatra II. He frequently appealed to his local nomarch, Dionysios, about injustices and crimes committed against him, including an occasion on which he claimed to have been nearly murdered by temple workers for being Greek. Ptolemaios, Apollonios and the twins also recorded their dreams, which were regarded as having prophetic significance.

The archive abruptly ends on 20 September 152 BC, during Ptolemaios' twentieth year in katoche. It is unclear how much longer Ptolemaios remained in katoche, and whether he was ever released from it.

== In popular culture ==
The twins Taous and Tawe, and their half-brother Pachrates, appear in a main quest in the 2017 video game Assassin's Creed Origins.

== See also ==
- Horos son of Nechoutes
- Dryton and Apollonia archive
- Zenon of Kaunos

== Sources ==
- Bagnall, Roger; Derow, Peter (August 2003). "IX". The Hellenistic Period: Historical Sources in Translation. Wiley. ISBN 9781405101325. Archived from the original on 31 January 2022.
- Bevan, Edwyn (1927). "IX". The House of Ptolemy A History of Hellenistic Egypt under the Ptolemaic Dynasty. Ares Publishers. ISBN 9780890055366.
- Clarysse, Willy; Vandorpe, Katelijn (2006). "A Demotic Lease of Temple Land Reused in the "Katochoi" Archive (Louvre N 2328A)". Ancient Society. 36. doi:10.2143/AS.36.0.2017825. JSTOR 44079871.
- Einaudi, Luigi (January 1948). Greatness and decline of planned economy in the Hellenistic world. ISBN 9781131398716.
- Ray, John (17 February 2012). "Voices from Ancient Egypt Gallery". BBC.
- Szpakowska, Kasia (November 2006). Through a Glass Darkly: Magic, Dreams and Prophecy in Ancient Egypt. ISBN 9781905125081.
- Thompson, Dorothy (February 2012). Memphis Under the Ptolemies: Second Edition. ISBN 9780691140339.
- Vierros, Marja (2020). "3 Idiolect in focus: Two brothers in the Memphis Sarapieion (II BCE)". Varieties of Post-classical and Byzantine Greek. De Gruyter Mouton 2021. pp. 39–74. doi:10.1515/9783110614404-003. hdl:10138/338662. ISBN 9783110614404. S2CID 234323280.
