= Adler Papyri =

Greek papyri from the 1st and 2nd century BCE

The Adler Papyri designates a collection of papyri established by Lord Elkan Nathan Adler during his visits to Egypt. The majority of the papyri belonged to the archive of Horos son of Nechoutes which he reportedly acquired in 1924, but the collection also included documents from the archive of Panas son of Espemetis and a few other items. Fifty-one of the papyri were published in a volume entitled The Adler Papyri. The published papyri are now in the Papyrus Carlsberg Collection at the University of Copenhagen.

== Bibliography ==
- Elkan Nathan Adler; John Gavin Tait; Fritz M. Heichelheim; Francis Llewellyn Griffith (1939). The Adler Papyri. London: Oxford University Press.
