= Fritz Heichelheim =

Fritz Moritz Heichelheim FRSC
- Born: May 6, 1901; Gießen, Hesse, Germany
- Died: April 22, 1968 (aged 66); Toronto, Ontario, Canada

Academic background
- Education: University of Gießen
- Thesis: Foreign Inhabitants of Ptolemaic Empire

Academic work
- Discipline: Ancient history
- Sub-discipline: Ancient economic history
- Institutions: University of Toronto

Fritz Moritz Heichelheim FRSC (May 6, 1901 – April 22, 1968) was a German-born ancient historian, who specialized in ancient economic history, at the University of Gießen and as Professor of Greek and Roman History at the University of Toronto.

Fritz Moritz Heichelheim was the son of a banker, Albert and his wife Bertha (née Simonsfeld). She was murdered by the Nazis in 1942.

Heichelheim was a pupil of the ancient historian Richard Laqueur at Gießen where he took his doctorate in 1925 and his habilitation in 1929. His doctoral thesis was "Foreign Inhabitants of Ptolemaic Empire" while his habilitation thesis was "Economic Fluctuations from the Time of Alexander to that of Augustus". He worked between his doctorate and habilitation as a high school teacher.

After lecturing there for nearly four years, he, like his colleague at Gießen, Margarete Bieber, was dismissed in 1933 following the National Socialists’ "cleansing" of the universities (see Law for the Restoration of the Professional Civil Service). However, he was dismissed a few months earlier because of a defiant lecture on Jews in Roman Palestine and Syria.

Like many German scholars, he was forced to emigrate abroad. He lived for many years without a steady job as a private tutor in Cambridge, England, and the receipt of a fellowship from the University of Cambridge. In that year, he married his wife Gerta (née Oppenheimer). In 1938, he published the German version of An Ancient economic history.

With an improvement of the terms of his fellowship, he and his wife decided to have a child who was born in 1939 and named Peter. At the outbreak of the Second World War, he volunteered to join the branch of the British Army for noncitizens but was refused because of his age. In 1940 Heichelheim was interned by the British as a German alien. Two years later he was hired at as an assistant lecturer at the University of Nottingham. He received British Citizenship immediately following the Second World War. He directed the excavation of a Roman Site at Cross Hill, Nottingham. Also at that time, he tried to make contact with German universities. In 1948 he went there for a short time as an honorary professor of economic history.

In 1948 he went to Canada as a lecturer at the University of Toronto. He was promoted at first to assistant professor and to associate professor. Finally, he was made a full professor at the University of Toronto from 1962 to his death. He went briefly to Germany as a visiting professor at the Free University of Berlin in 1963. He was elected a Fellow of The Royal Society of Canada in 1966.

He was one of the early members of Congregation Habonim Toronto, a liberal synagogue founded by Holocaust survivors and refugees from Central Europe, who arrived in Canada after World War II, and one of the first Holocaust refugee/survivor congregations to develop in Canada.

On April 22, 1968, he died at Toronto.

Despite the difficulties he had, he published two books and over 600 articles. A History of the Roman People is still in print. This productivity can be explained partially by the fact that since his student days, he slept only four hours at night.

At the University of Cambridge, he began cataloging the Greek coins in the Fitzwilliam Museum. The results of these labors can be seen in Sylloge Nummorum Graecorum, Vol. 4, Parts 1-6 (London, 1940–65). He also collaborated with E. N. Adler, F. L. Griffith, and J. G. Tait in the publication of The Adler Papyri (London, 1939).

Heichelheim tried to foster closer relations between the Universities of Giessen and Toronto. It was through his initiative that the two institutions embarked on a cooperative project, that of editing and publishing the Greek, Coptic, and certain Latin papyri preserved in the university library at Giessen.

A particularly interesting article was Roman Coins from Iceland from 1952. He theorized that the Roman coins found in Iceland were from Germans at the time of the Roman Empire who traveled to Iceland. A modern discussion is found in Roman Coins in Iceland by David Bjarni Heidarsson on https://skemman.is/stream/get/1946/5084/15120/2/Badbh.pdf. Heichelheim's contribution is discussed on page 20. At the time there was interest not only by scholars but in the public press including The New York Times.

== Literary works ==
- Wirtschaftliche Schwanklungen der Zeit von Alexander bis Augustus, Jena 1930 (Economic Fluctuations from the time of Alexander to that of Augustus).
- Die auswärtige Bevölkerung im Ptolemäerreich, Leipzig 1925 (Foreign Inhabitants of Ptolemaic Empire).
- The Adler Papyri (London, 1939).
- Sylloge Nummorum Graecorum, Vol. 4, Parts 1-6 (London, 1940–65).
- Roman Coins from Iceland, Antiquity 26, pp. 43–45.
- An Ancient economic history, 2 vols., Leiden, first edition 1938, second edition 1968.
- A History of the Roman People Prentice-Hall, first edition 1962, second edition 1984, third edition 2003.

== See also ==
- List of German Canadians
