= Cleopatra I Syra =

Queen of Ptolemaic Egypt

Royal titulary
Horus name
Hunu Zatheqa Iretenheqa Mereneterubaqet Kheqerenshenemu Tatetzat Huti Werpehti Sehertawi Redinesnebetirekhitenneferu Qenisinetnebzau Tenisiathoremmeruts
The young girl, daughter of the ruler, created by the ruler, beloved of the Gods of Egypt, adorned by Khnum, the regent of Thoth whose might is great,
who pleases the two Lands, who gives the people in perfection to the Two Ladies, who Neith, the Lady of Sais, makes strong, who Hathor praises for her popularity
G5	H wn W nw A17 S38 H8 X1 X1 D4 m S38 X1 H8 nTrw N36 D10 X1 O49 R21 n W22 C4[...]
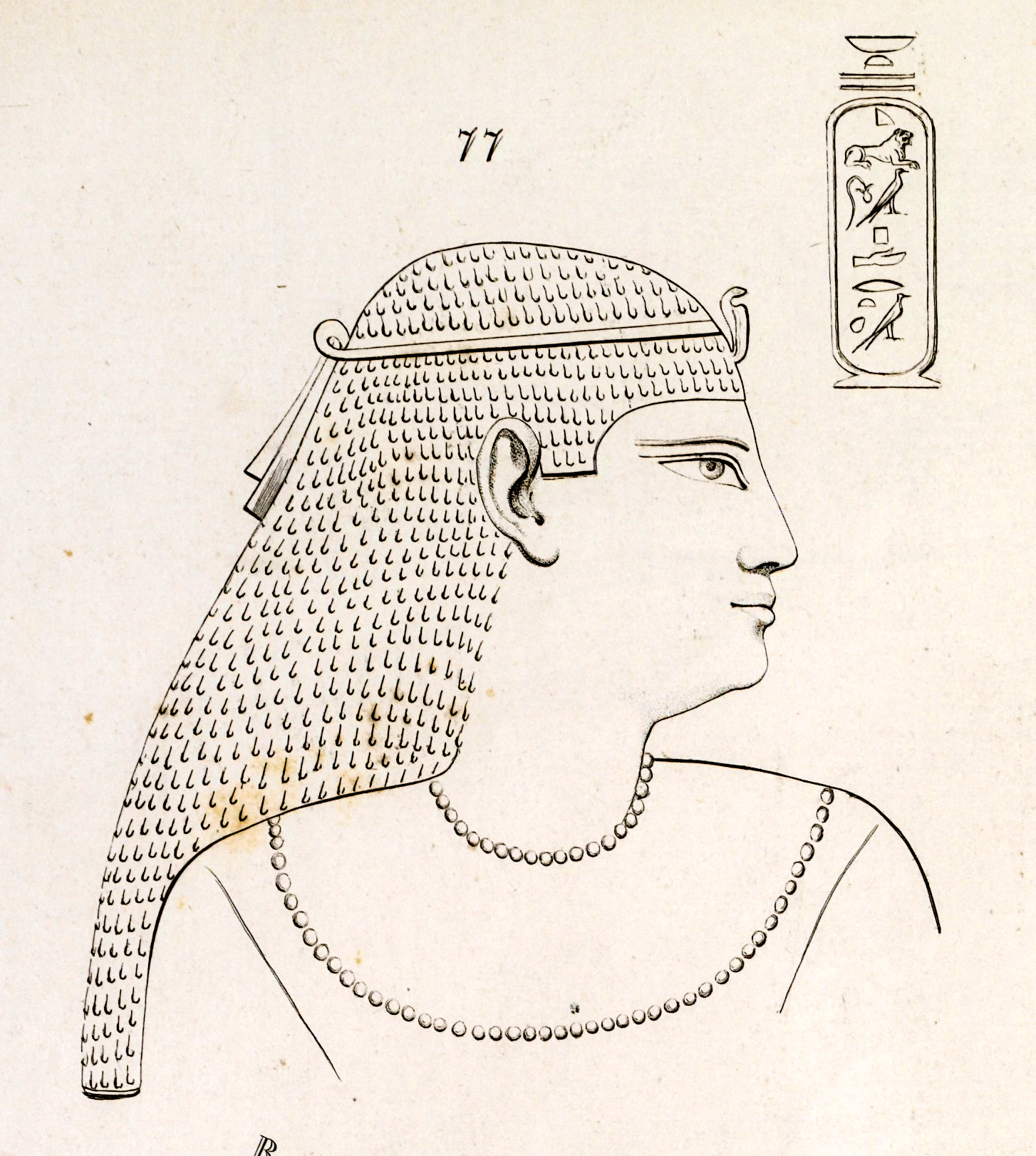
- Depiction based on a relief of Cleopatra I

Queen consort of Egypt (Note: Cleopatra was granted titles of "female Pharaoh", "female Horus" and "female ruler" during her husband's reign, which could indicate she became ruler alongside him, however she was not recognized as sovereign by Hellenistic administration of the country. After Ptolemy V died, Cleopatra I was acknowledged as sovereign ruler alongside her son Ptolemy VI, however her position is said to come from being guardian of her son, making ambiguous whether she should be considered her son's regent or co-regent.)
- Tenure: 193 – 180 BC

Regent of Egypt
- Regency: 180 – 176 BC

Vizier
- Born: c. 204 BC
- Died: 176 BC or 178/177 BC
- Spouse: Ptolemy V of Egypt
- Issue: Ptolemy VI of Egypt; Ptolemy VIII Physcon; Cleopatra II of Egypt
- Dynasty: Seleucid
- Father: Antiochus III the Great
- Mother: Laodice III

Cleopatra Thea Epiphanes Syra (Greek: Κλεοπάτρα ἡ Σύρα; c. 204 – 176 BC), well known as Cleopatra I or Cleopatra Syra, was a princess of the Seleucid Empire, Queen of Ptolemaic Egypt by marriage to Ptolemy V of Egypt from 193 BC, and regent of Egypt during the minority of their son, Ptolemy VI, from her husband's death in 180 BC until her own death in 176 BC. She is sometimes viewed as co-ruler to her husband and son; however, evidence is conflicting.

== Life ==
Cleopatra I was the daughter of Antiochus III the Great, King of the Seleucid Empire, and Queen Laodice III.

=== Queen ===
In 197 BC, Antiochus III had captured a number of cities in Asia Minor previously under the control of the Ptolemaic Kingdom of Egypt. The Romans supported the Egyptian interests, when they negotiated with the Seleucid king in Lysimachia in 196 BC. In response, Antiochus III indicated his willingness to make peace with Ptolemy V and to have his daughter Cleopatra I marry Ptolemy V. They were betrothed in 195 BC and their marriage took place in 193 BC in Raphia. At that time Ptolemy V was about 16 years and Cleopatra I about 10 years old. Later on, Egypt's Ptolemaic kings were to argue that Cleopatra I had received Coele-Syria as her dowry and, therefore, this territory again belonged to Egypt. It is not clear if this was the case. However, in practice, Coele-Syria remained a Seleucid possession after the Battle of Panium in 198 BC.

In Alexandria, Cleopatra I was referred to as the Syrian. As part of the Ptolemaic cult she was honoured with her husband as Theoi Epiphaneis. In line with ancient Egyptian tradition of sibling marriage, she was also named sister (Ancient Greek: ἀδελφή, adelphḗ) of Ptolemy V. A synod of priests held at Memphis in 185 BC granted Cleopatra all the honours that had been given to Ptolemy V in 196 BC (inscribed on the bilingual Greek-Egyptian Rosetta Stone).

Cleopatra also held title of vizier as one of only two known Ptolemaic queens to do so (the first one being Berenice II of Egypt).

=== Queen Regent ===
Ptolemy V died unexpectedly in September 180 BC, at the age of only 30. Cleopatra I's son, Ptolemy VI, who was only six years old, was immediately crowned king, with Cleopatra as his regent. She was the first Ptolemaic queen to rule without her husband. In documents from this period, Cleopatra is named Thea Epiphanes and her name appears before Ptolemy. Coins were minted under the joint authority of her and her son.

Just before his death, Ptolemy V had been planning a new war against the Seleucid kingdom, but Cleopatra immediately ended the war preparations and pursued a peaceful policy, because of her own Seleucid roots and because a war would have threatened her hold on power. Cleopatra probably died in late 178 or early 177 BC, though some scholars place her death in late 176 BC.

On her deathbed, Cleopatra appointed Eulaeus and Lenaeus, two of her close associates as regents. Eulaeus, a eunuch, had been the Ptolemy's tutor. Lenaeus was a Syrian slave who had probably come to Egypt as part of Cleopatra's retinue when she got married. The pair were unable or unwilling to prevent the deterioration of relations with the Seleucid kingdom which culminated in the disastrous Sixth Syrian War.

== Issue ==
Cleopatra and Ptolemy V had three children:

Name	Image	Birth	Death	Notes
Ptolemy VI Philometor		May/June 186 BC	145 BC	Succeeded as King under the regency of his mother in 180 BC, co-regent and spouse of Cleopatra II from 170 to 164 BC and again 163-145 BC.
Cleopatra II		186-184 BC	6 April 115 BC	Co-regent and wife of Ptolemy VI from 170 to 145 BC, co-regent and spouse of Ptolemy VIII from 145 to 132 BC, claimed sole rule 132-127 BC, co-regent and spouse of Ptolemy VIII again from 124 to 115 BC, co-regent with Cleopatra III and Ptolemy IX from 116 to 115 BC.
Ptolemy VIII		c. 184 BC	26 June 116 BC	Co-regent with Ptolemy VI and Cleopatra II from 169 to 164 BC, expelled Ptolemy VI in 164, expelled in turn 163 BC, King of Cyrenaica from 163 to 145 BC, co-regent with Cleopatra II and Cleopatra III from 145 to 132 BC and again from 124 to 116 BC.

== Sources ==
- Grainger, John D. (2010). The Syrian Wars. Brill. pp. 281–328. ISBN 9789004180505.
- Hölbl, Günther (2001). A History of the Ptolemaic Empire. London & New York: Routledge. pp. 143–152 & 181–194. ISBN 0415201454.
- Morkholm, Otto (1961). "Eulaios and Lenaios". Classica et Medievalia. 22: 32–43.
- Stähelin, Kleopatra 14). In: Realencyclopädie der Classischen Altertumswissenschaft, vol. XI 1, 1921, col. 738–740.
- Werner Huß, Ägypten in hellenistischer Zeit (Egypt in the Hellenistic Period). Munich 2001, p. 499; 514f.; 535; 537–540.
- Günther Hölbl, Geschichte des Ptolemäerreichs (History of the Ptolemaic Empire). Darmstadt 1994, p. 125; 127f.; 147f.; 153.

Cleopatra I Syra Ptolemaic dynasty Born: 204 BC Died: 176 BC
Preceded by Arsinoe III	Queen consort of Egypt; 193-180 BC	Succeeded by Cleopatra II
Preceded by Ptolemy V (as King)	Regent of Egypt; 180 BC–176 BC	Succeeded by Eulaeus and Lenaeus
