= Elkan Nathan Adler =

English author (1861–1946)

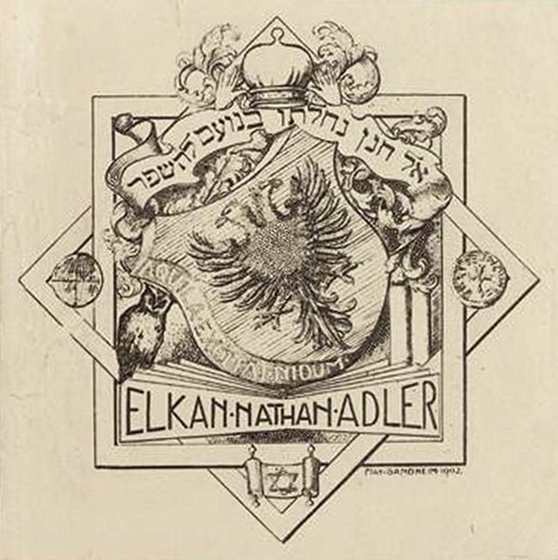
Adler's bookplate.

Elkan Nathan Adler (24 July 1861 in St Luke's, London – 15 September 1946 in London) was an English author, lawyer, historian, and collector of Jewish books and manuscripts. Adler's father was Nathan Marcus Adler, Chief Rabbi of the British Empire. He travelled extensively and built an enormous library, particularly of old Jewish documents. Adler was among the first to explore the documents stored in the Cairo Genizah, being in fact the first European to enter it. During his visits to Cairo in 1888 and 1895 Adler collected and brought over 25,000 Genizah manuscript fragments back to England.

Adler was particularly interested in the history of Persian (Iranian) Jews. He travelled to Tehran and Bukhara in 1896 and 1897, where he purchased various Hebrew and Judeo-Persian manuscripts and later published descriptive lists of their contents. These publications provided Western scholars with critical insight into the cultural, literary, and intellectual endeavors pursued by the Jews of Iran. The manuscripts collected by Adler include both religious and secular works on various topics, including stories, folklore, calendars, biblical and Talmudic dictionaries, prayer books, liturgical hymns, discourses on Kabbalah (Jewish mysticism), and chronicles of religious persecution. In his 1921 summary, Catalogue of Hebrew Manuscripts in the Collection of E. N. Adler, Adler described over 4,500 manuscripts in his collection.

Overall, Adler collected some 30,000 printed books in Judaica. Unfortunately for him, a business associate's embezzlement forced him to sell most of his library to the Jewish Theological Seminary of America in New York City and Hebrew Union College in Cincinnati in 1923. Moreover, Adler agreed to bequeath his subsequent acquisitions to the Jewish Theological Seminary upon his death.

During a visit to Egypt in 1924, Adler acquired a recently discovered jar that contained the private archive of an Egyptian mercenary, Horos son of Nechoutes (c. 145-88 BC), and he personally contributed to the edition of the documents which were published as The Adler Papyri.

Adler published many books about his travels and on his extensive collections, including About Hebrew Manuscripts (1905), A Gazetteer of Hebrew Printing (1917); Jews in Many Lands (1905); Auto de Fe and Jew (1908); History of the Jews of London (1930); Jewish Travellers (1930, repr. 1966); and articles on the Samaritans and on the History of the Jews in Egypt and Persia. Adler was extremely active in English-Jewish communal affairs, especially in education, and was an ardent Zionist; he was an early member of the Hovevei Zion in England. Per his will, his personal archives are now at the library of the Jewish Theological Seminary of America.
