= Ptolemy Eupator =

co-ruler of Cyprus
- Born: 165/164 BC
- Died: August 152 BC
- Burial: Cyprus
- Greek: Πτολεμαίος Ευπάτωρ
- Dynasty: Ptolemaic
- Father: Ptolemy VI Philometor
- Mother: Cleopatra II of Egypt

Ptolemy Eupator (Greek: Πτολεμαίος Ευπάτωρ, Ptolemaios Eupatōr, "Ptolemy the Well-fathered [God]") was the son of Ptolemy VI Philometor and Cleopatra II, and for a short time in 152 BC reigned as co-ruler on Cyprus with his father. It is thought that Ptolemy Eupator died in August of that same year.

Ptolemy Eupator is attested on small number of documents and inscriptions: he is mentioned in a demotic papyrus held by the British Museum, is referenced as a priest of the cult of Alexander during 158–157 BC, and that he was a co-regent with his father in 152 BC. Ptolemy Eupator was probably aged 12 or 13 when he died. His name was added to the list of deified Ptolemies, ahead of that of his father, whom he predeceased.

When Ptolemy Eupator was first discovered in the lists of deified Ptolemies (which was actually arranged in order of death and deification, not reign), there was a theory that he was an elder brother of his father, and reigned before him. As a result, some 19th-century texts count Ptolemy Philometor as "Ptolemy VII" (instead of "Ptolemy VI"), and increment the numbers of all later Ptolemies by one until "Ptolemy XVI Caesarion" (instead of "Ptolemy XV"). The epithets, which have come down from antiquity, are unchanged.

The discovery of a tomb alleged to be his, on Cyprus, was announced in 2017.

== Bibliography ==
- Ager, Sheila L. (2006). "The Power of Excess: Royal Incest and the Ptolemaic Dynasty". Anthropologica. 48 (2). Canadian Anthropology Society: 165–186. doi:10.2307/25605309. JSTOR 25605309.
- Dodson, Aidan; Hilton, Dyan (2004). The Complete Royal Families of Ancient Egypt. Thames & Hudson. ISBN 0-500-05128-3.
