= Horos son of Nechoutes =

Horos son of Nechoutes (c. 145-88 BC) was an Egyptian mercenary stationed in the military camp of Pathyris (modern Gebelein) near Thebes in Upper Egypt. Many details about his life and family are known thanks to the survival of his private archive, written on papyrus, which was discovered in a jar in the early 1920s. The bulk of the papyri - more than fifty documents - was acquired by Lord Elkan Nathan Adler in 1924. They are, according, referred to as the "Adler Papyri". After Adler's death, they passed through several private collectors - being sold in 1948 to Martin Bodmer of Geneva, in 1970 to Hans P. Kraus of New York, and in 1989 to Martin Schøyen of Oslo - before they were acquired in 2012 for the Papyrus Carlsberg Collection (University of Copenhagen) with means provided by the Augustinus Foundation and the Carlsberg Foundation.

Horos son of Nechoutes served the kings Ptolemy VIII (Euergetes II), Ptolemy IX (Soter II), and Ptolemy X (Alexander I) successively. His archive covers the period of 135-89 BC, and it was presumably abandoned - alongside several other surviving archives from Pathyris - when his military camp fell to rebel forces in 88 BC. Horos' physical appearance is described in one document as 'of middling size, honey-colored, curly-haired, bald on the fore-head, long-faced, straight-nosed, and with left ear bored'. He was born sometime in the 140's BC and left military service when he was about 50 years old. His military life brought him as far as Syria during an expedition in the reign of Ptolemy X (Alexander I). At one point in his career he was rewarded with a gold diadem and a royal chiton.

His private documents mainly consist of sale and loan contracts, but also include the marriage contracts of his two daughters and other legal papers. He invested his income and became relatively wealthy. He owned building plots in the town as well as grain land, palm groves, vineyards, and even parts (shares) of pigeon houses. Parts of archives belonging to his relatives (including his brother Phibis and his cousin Panebchounis) also survive and together they provide information about social life in late Hellenistic Egypt.

== See also ==
- Ptolemaios son of Glaucias
