= Dryton and Apollonia archive =

The Dryton and Apollonia archive consists of fifty-three papyri and eight ostraka written in both Koine Greek and Demotic Egyptian from 174 to 94 BCE. The archive documents include wills, financial transactions, and divorces of a household living in the cities of Ptolemais and Pathyris in southern Egypt during the Ptolemaic dynasty. Currently these documents are scattered amongst museum collections in the United States, Great Britain, France, Germany, and Egypt.

== Family ==
The oldest documents in the archive belong to Dryton, who was born around 192 BCE. His father Pamphilus had immigrated to Egypt from Crete in the reign of Ptolemy III or IV and joined the military. Dryton followed him into the army, becoming a cavalry officer in Upper Egypt. At some point in his early career, he served at Thebes, where he visited the Valley of the Kings, where graffiti inscribed by him have been found on the walls of the tomb of Ramesses IV and the tomb of Ramesses VI. In 164 BCE, Dryton married his first wife, Sarapias, while serving at Diospolis Parva. They had a son, Esthladas. The marriage ended, but we do not know whether this was due to divorce or Sarapias' death.

Dryton transferred to Pathyris, taking Esthladas with him. There he married for a second time on 4 March 150 BCE, to Apollonia, also known by the Egyptian name of Senmonthis, who most likely was a teen, to his almost fifty years of age. Apollonia belonged to a local family and was of mixed Egyptian and Greek ancestry. Her father, Ptolemaeus aka Pamenus of Cyrene was a soldier in the infantry division of Dryton's unit. She had three sisters.

Apollonia and Dryton had five daughters, each of whom went by both Greek and Egyptian names: Apollonia/Senmouthis, Aristo/Semonthis, Aphrodisia/Takhratis, Nikarion/Thermouthis, Apollonia the Younger/Senpelaia. The family owned four female slaves, named Eirene, Ampelium, Myrsine, and an unnamed daughter of Myrsine. They seem to have been the only slave-owning family in Pathyris. Dryton died in or shortly after 126 BCE. Some of his papyri were inherited by Esthladas and are now lost. The papyri which form the surviving archive were inherited by Dryton and Apollonia Senmonthis' eldest daughter, Apollonia/Senmouthis and her husband Caeës. They had three daughters, who only bore Egyptian names: Tbokanoupis, Senmonthis, and Senenouphis. Tbokanoupis married Phagonis and they had a daughter, whose name is unknown. Caeës died in 91 BCE and the latest document in the archive dates to 88 BCE.

== Themes ==
The significance of this archive is that the documents seem to interchange between two languages in such a way that one may presume the entire household to be bilingual. Esthladas seems to have followed in his father's footsteps and earned a living as a professional soldier and through private land ownership. He appears to have adapted to a more Egyptian way of life and was also both fluent and literate in the Egyptian language of Demotic and Greek as many of the later documents pertain to him specifically. He inherited the majority of land and assets following his father's death, but some of it was inherited by his step-mother and step-sisters.

Another focus for those who study this archive is on the relationships between mother and the five daughters as a way to glimpse gender roles of both Greek and Egyptian families. In Dryton's last will in 126 BCE he states that:

"And to my wife Apollonia also called Senmonthis, if she stays home and is irreproachable, [his children] shall give every month for four years for the maintenance of herself and her two daughters 2½ artabs of wheat, 1/12 of croton, and 200 copper drachmas... Whatever property Senmonthis may have evidently acquired for herself while married to Dryton, she is to continue to own."

In addition to maintaining possession of land, Apollonia was also involved in lending money, which is seen in a number of documents that record her financial transactions. Her five daughters were all kept and raised which follows the Egyptian custom of avoiding infanticide regardless of money or gender. This particular will also gives their daughters a small portion of the estate. He also provided dowry arrangements for Aristo and Aphrodisia. At this time his first daughter, Apollonia, appears to have been married, so she did not receive an additional sum of money. Nikarion and Apollonia the Younger were mere children and an amount of money was to be given them until they turned 17 or 18 years old.

== Bibliography ==
- Lewis, Naphtali (1986). Greeks in Ptolemaic Egypt. Oxford University Press, 88–103. ISBN 0-19-814867-4.
- Pomeroy, Sarah B. (1984). Women in Hellenistic Egypt. Schocken Books, 103–123. ISBN 0-8052-3911-1.
- Vandorpe, Katelijn (2002). The Bilingual Family Archive of Dryton, his Wife Apollonia and their Daughter Senmouthis. Brussels. ISBN 9789065699015.
