= Ptolemy VI Philometor =

6th Pharaoh of Ptolemaic Egypt

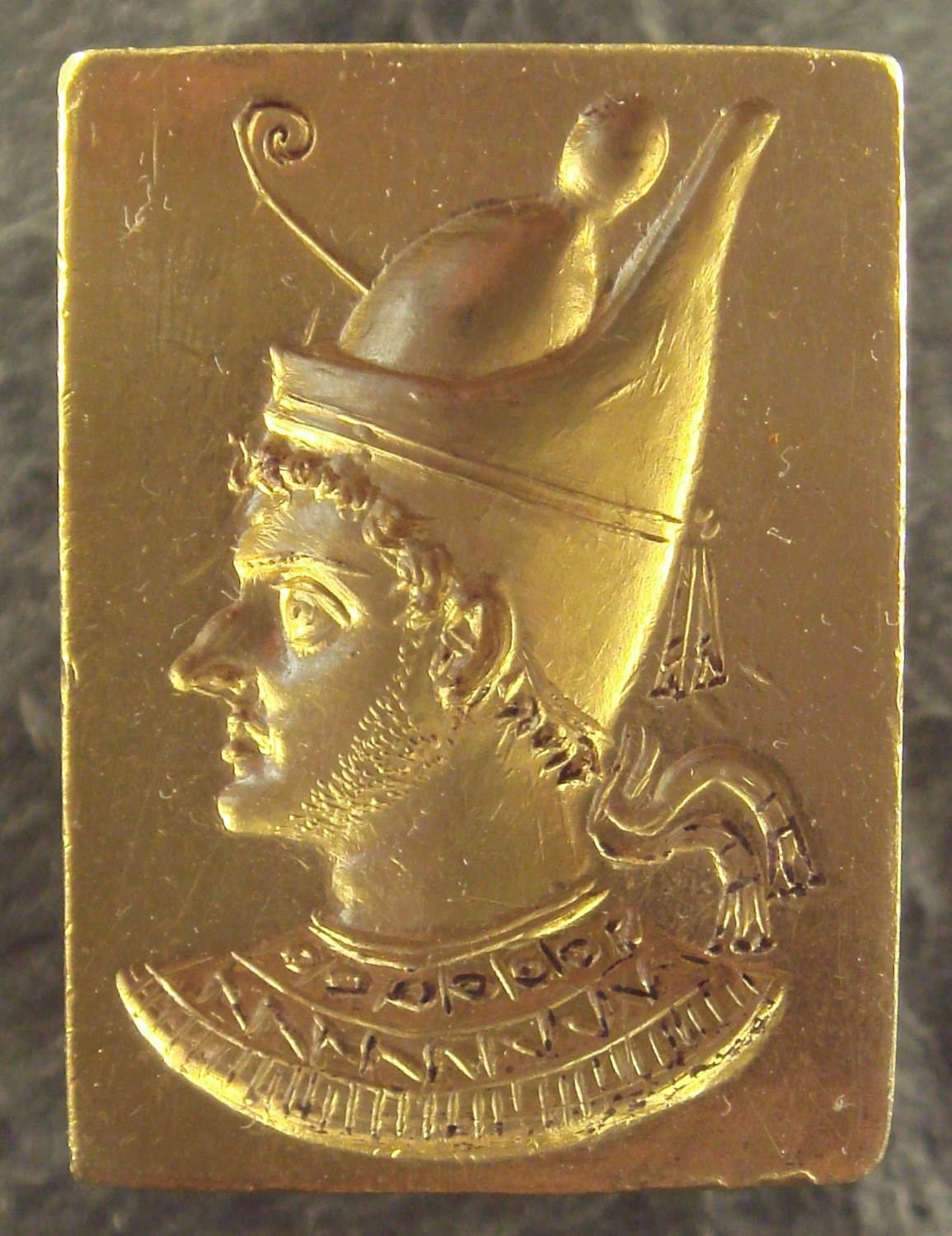
- Ring of Ptolemy VI wearing an Egyptian pschent

Pharaoh and King of the Ptolemaic Kingdom
- Reign: 180 – 164 BC; 163 – 145 BC
- Coregency: Cleopatra II (170-145 BC); Ptolemy VIII (170-164 BC)
- Predecessor: Ptolemy V Cleopatra I
- Successor: Ptolemy VIII; Cleopatra II
Royal titulary
Horus name
ṯnj-m-ẖt ḥtr-ḥpw-Ꜥnḫ-ḥr-msḫnt.sn
Tjeniemkhet Heterhapuankhhermeskhen(e)tsen
Distinguished in the sanctuary, the twin brother of the living Apis bull upon their birth stone
G5	C18 M X F51B t A26 A26 H Aa5 p E1 anx D2 Z1 ms s x nw O39 O39 z n
Nebty name
m-mꜢꜤt sḫꜤj-n-sw-jt.f
Emmaat sekhaensuitef
Truly, whose father enthroned him
G16	Aa15 Aa11 t H8 s xa a n sw w t f Z1 f
Golden Horus
wr-pḥtj nb-ḥbw-sd-mj-ptḥ tꜢ-ṯnn-jt-nṯrw ity-mj-rꜤ
Werpehty Nebhabused Miptahtatjenenitnetjeru Itymire
The one great of strength,
a possessor of Sed festivals like Ptah Ta-Tjenen, the father of the gods, and a sovereign like Ra
G8	wr r F9 F9 nb O23 Z3 p t H C18 mi i R7 f t Z1 nTr Z1 nTr Z1 nTr Z1 i i A23 x Z1 mi
Prenomen
wr-pḥtj nb-ḥbw-sd-mi-ptḥ tꜢ-ṯnn-jt-nṯrw jty-mj-rꜤ
Iwaennetjerwyperu Setepenptahkheperi Irymaatamunre
Heir of the two gods who has emerged, chosen by Ptah-Khepri,
who carried out Maat (for) Amun-Ra

M23 X1 L2 X1	nTr N8 nTr F44 p t H xpr r C12 stp n C2 C12 ir Aa11 t H8

M23 X1 L2 X1	nTr pr r D54 nTr F44 n p t H xpr r stp n C2 C12 ir Aa11

M23 X1 L2 X1	nTr N8 nTr F44 n p t H xpr r stp n C2 C12 D4 Sw t H8

M23 X1 L2 X1	nTr N8 nTr F44 p t H n stp ir Aa11 n C2 C12 r H H
Nomen
ptwlmjs Ꜥnḫ-ḏtmrj-ptḥ
Ptolemys Ankhdjetmeryptah
Ptolemaios, living forever, beloved of Ptah

G39 N5	p t wA l M i i s anx D&t&N17 p t H mr
- Consort: Cleopatra II (m. 175 BC)
- Children: Ptolemy Eupator; Cleopatra Thea, Queen of Syria; Cleopatra III, Queen of Egypt; Ptolemy
- Father: Ptolemy V
- Mother: Cleopatra I
- Born: May/June 186 BC (Note: The year is deduced from: (1) the award of extensive divine honours to his mother Cleopatra I in the Philae I decree of 185 BC, (2) the fact that Ptolemy VI's Horus name refers to him as 'twin brother of the living Apis Bull', which suggests that he was born in the same year as an Apis Bull - the only available candidate was born and installed in 185 BC: Koenen, Ludwig (1960). "Die 'demotische Zivilprozessordnung' und die Philanthropa vom 9. Okt. 186 vor Chr". Archiv für Papyrusforschung. 17: 13 n. 2.. The month is known from an inscription on Cyprus (SEG 20.311), recording birthday celebrations in his honour in the month of Pharmouthi: Mitford, T. B. (1961). "Further Contributions to the Epigraphy of Cyprus". American Journal of Archaeology. 65 (2): 129. doi:10.2307/502666. JSTOR 502666. S2CID 191391700.)
- Died: 145 BC (aged 41)
- Burial: Alexandria
- Dynasty: Ptolemaic dynasty

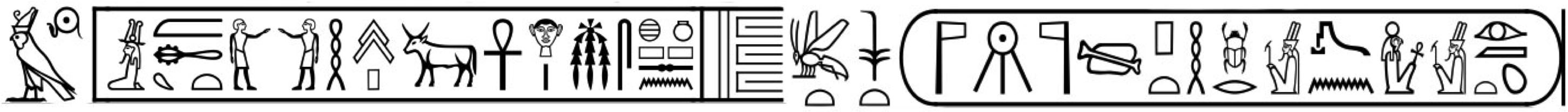
Ptolemy VI Philometor (Greek: Πτολεμαῖος Φιλομήτωρ, Ptolemaĩos Philomḗtōr; (Note: "Ptolemy, lover of his Mother". Numbering the Ptolemies is a modern convention. Older sources may give a number one higher or lower. The most reliable way of determining which Ptolemy is being referred to in any given case is by epithet (e.g. "Philopator").) 186–145 BC) was a Greek king of Ptolemaic Egypt who reigned from 180 to 164 BC and from 163 to 145 BC. He is often considered the last ruler of ancient Egypt when that state was still a major power. (Note: Distinguished in the sanctuary, the twin brother of the living Apis bull upon their birth stone, heir of the two gods who has emerged, chosen by Ptah-Khapri, who carried out Maat for Amun-Ra)

Ptolemy VI, the eldest son of King Ptolemy V and Queen Cleopatra I, came to the throne aged six when his father died in 180 BC. The kingdom was governed by regents: his mother until her death in 178 or 177 BC and then two of her associates, Eulaeus and Lenaeus, until 169 BC. From 170 BC, his sister-wife Cleopatra II and his younger brother Ptolemy VIII were co-rulers alongside him. Ptolemy VI's reign was characterised by external conflict with the Seleucid Empire over Syria and by internal conflict with his younger brother for control of the Ptolemaic monarchy. In the Sixth Syrian War (170–168 BC), the Ptolemaic forces were utterly defeated and Egypt was twice invaded by Seleucid armies. A few years after the Seleucid conflict ended, Ptolemy VIII succeeded in expelling Ptolemy VI from Egypt in 164 BC.

In 163 BC, the people of Alexandria turned against Ptolemy VIII and invited Ptolemy VI back to the throne. In this second reign Ptolemy VI was much more successful in his conflicts against the Seleucids and his brother. He banished his brother to Cyrenaica and repeatedly prevented him from using that as a springboard to taking Cyprus, despite substantial Roman intervention in Ptolemy VIII's favour. By supporting a series of rival claimants for the Seleucid throne, Ptolemy VI helped instigate a civil war which would continue for generations and eventually consume the Seleucid dynasty. In 145 BC, Ptolemy VI invaded Seleucid Syria and won a total victory at the Battle of the Oenoparus, which left him in charge of both the Seleucid and Ptolemaic realms. However, injuries that he sustained in the battle led to his death three days later. The gains from the war were almost immediately lost and Ptolemy VIII returned to power.

== Background and early life ==
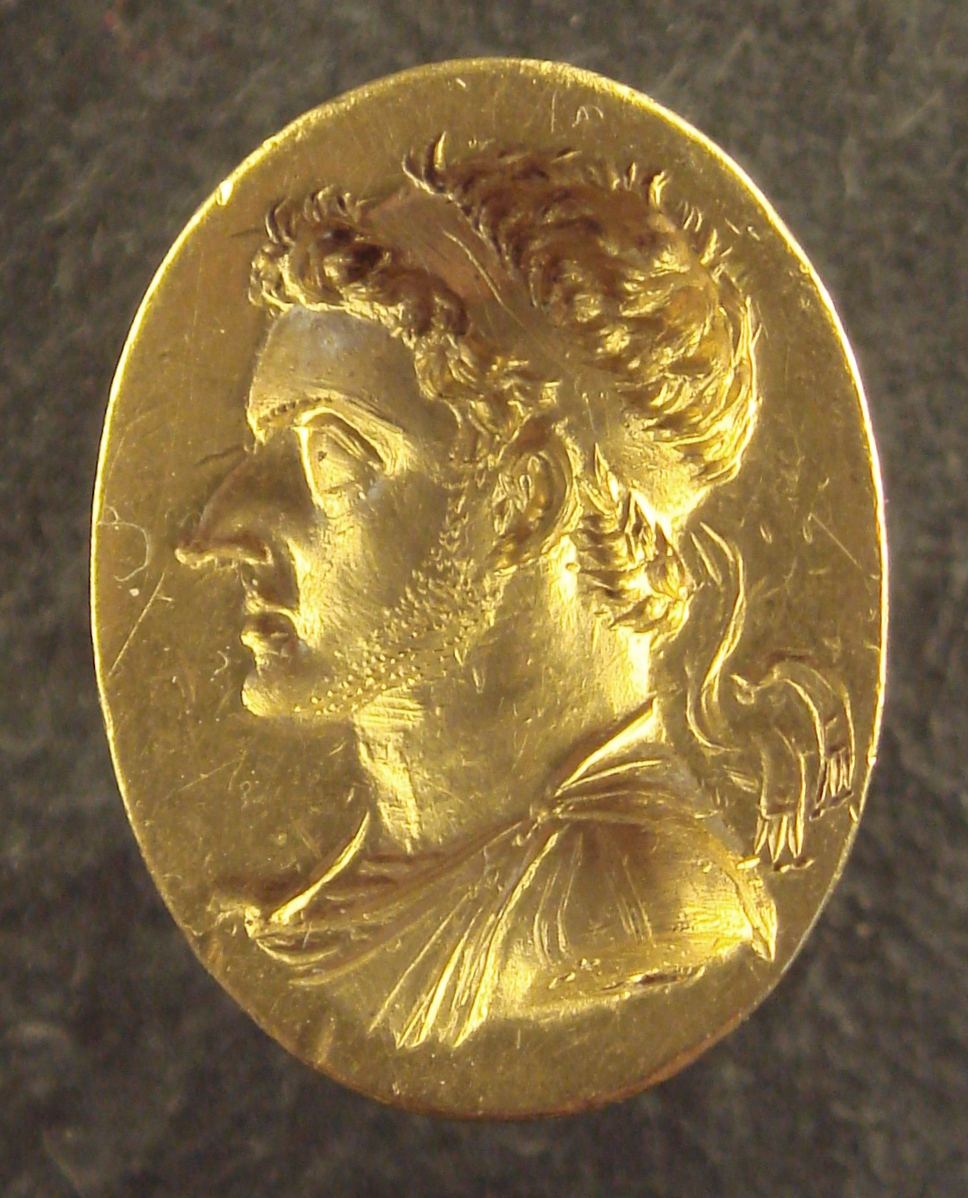
Golden ring depicting Ptolemy VI wearing a Greek diadem

Ptolemy VI was the eldest son of Ptolemy V and Cleopatra I. The early reign of Ptolemy V was dominated by the Fifth Syrian War (204–198 BC) against the Seleucid king Antiochus III, who completely defeated the Ptolemaic forces, annexed Coele-Syria and Judaea to his empire, and reduced Egypt to a subordinate position. Under a peace treaty, Ptolemy V married Antiochus III's daughter Cleopatra I in 194 BC.

Ptolemy VI was born in 186 BC, probably in May or June. He had two siblings: a sister, Cleopatra II, who was probably born between 186 and 184 BC, and a younger brother, Ptolemy VIII. His father advertised Ptolemy VI's position as heir within Egypt and to the wider world, for example by entering a chariot team under his name in the Panathenaic Games of 182 BC. The defeat in the Fifth Syrian War cast a shadow over the rest of Ptolemy V's reign. One prominent faction within the Ptolemaic court agitated for a return to war in order to restore Egyptian prestige, while another faction resisted the expense involved in rebuilding and remilitarising the realm. Ptolemy V died unexpectedly in September 180 BC, at the age of only 30. It is possible that he was murdered as a result of this factional infighting – a late source claims that he had been poisoned.

== First reign (180–164 BC) ==
=== Regencies ===
Ptolemy VI, who was only six years old, was immediately crowned king, with his mother Cleopatra I as co-regent. In documents from this period, Cleopatra I is named before Ptolemy VI and coins were minted under the joint authority of her and her son. The mother’s extraordinary role is also reflected in the epithet ‘Philometor’ (‘lover of his Mother’), which Ptolemy was given at an early age. In the face of continued agitation for war with the Seleucids, Cleopatra I pursued a peaceful policy, possibly because of her own Seleucid roots and because a war would have threatened her hold on power. She probably died in late 178 or early 177 BC, though some scholars place her death in late 176 BC.

Ptolemy VI was still too young to rule on his own. On her deathbed, Cleopatra I appointed Eulaeus and Lenaeus, two of her close associates, as regents. Eulaeus, a eunuch who had been Ptolemy VI's tutor, was the more senior of the two, even minting coinage in his own name. Lenaeus was a Syrian slave who had probably come to Egypt as part of Cleopatra I's retinue when she got married. He seems to have been specifically in charge of managing the kingdom's finances.

Eulaeus and Lenaeus sought to reinforce their authority by augmenting the dignity of Ptolemy VI. In early 175 BC, they arranged his marriage to his sister Cleopatra II. Brother-sister marriage was traditional in the Ptolemaic dynasty and was probably adopted in imitation of earlier Egyptian Pharaohs. The couple were incorporated into the Ptolemaic dynastic cult as the Theoi Philometores ('the Mother-loving Gods'), named in honour of the deceased Cleopatra I. In Egyptian religious contexts, the title recalled the relationship of the Pharaoh as Horus to his mother Isis. Ptolemy VI and Cleopatra II were still young children, so the marriage was not consummated for many years; they would eventually have at least four children together.

=== Sixth Syrian War (170 BC–168 BC) ===
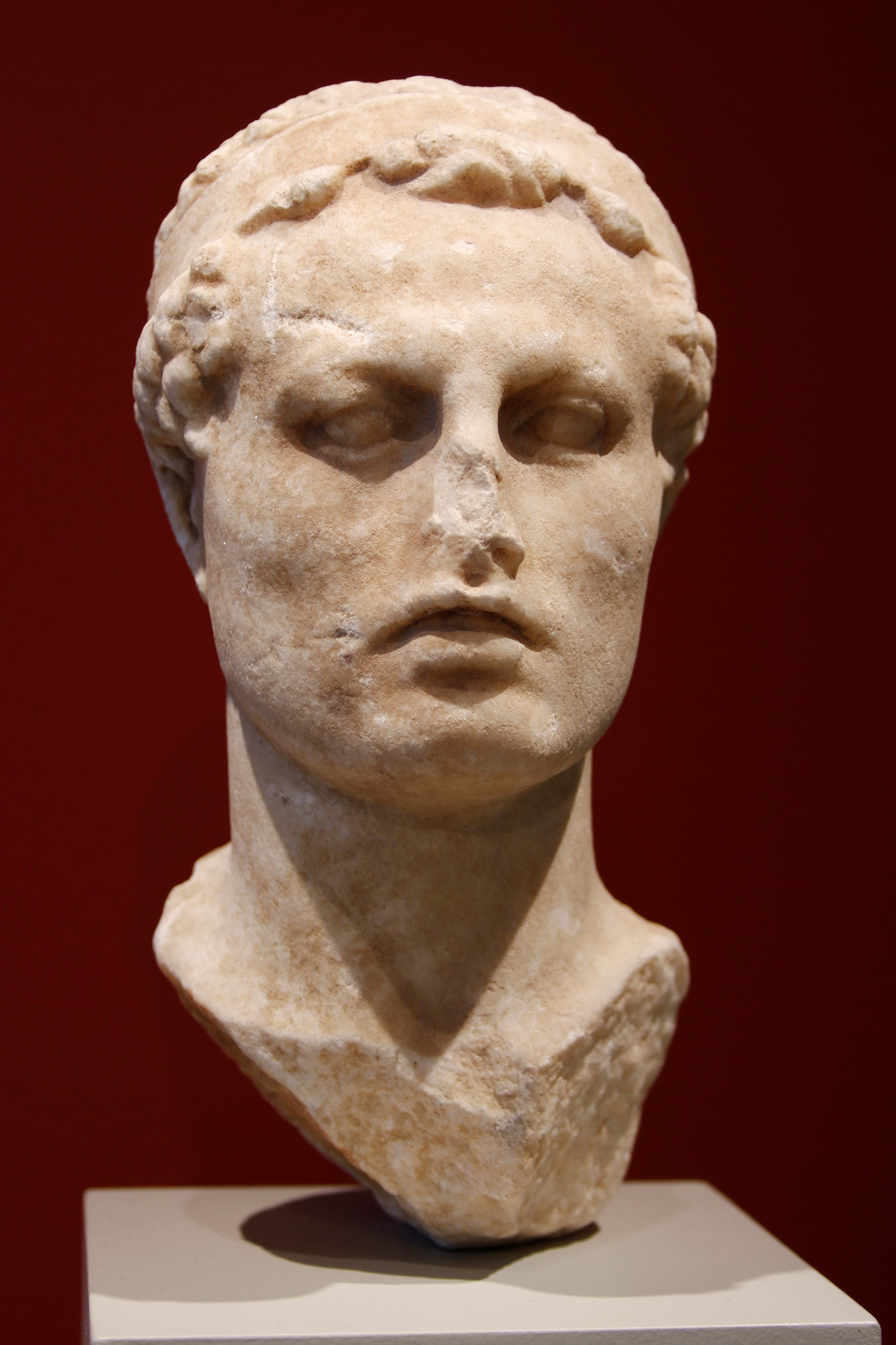
Antiochus IV

The Seleucid king Seleucus IV, Ptolemy VI's uncle, had followed a generally peaceful policy, but he was murdered in 175 BC. After two months of conflict his brother Antiochus IV secured the throne. The unsettled situation empowered the warhawks in the Ptolemaic court, and Eulaeus and Lenaeus were unable or unwilling to resist them, with Cleopatra I no longer alive. By 172 BC, preparations for war were underway. Rome and Macedon commenced the Third Macedonian War in 171 BC, lessening their ability to interfere with Ptolemaic affairs, and the Egyptian government considered the moment for war had come.

In October 170 BC, Ptolemy VIII was promoted to the status of co-regent alongside his brother and sister. The current year was declared the first year of a new era. John Grainger argues that the two brothers had become the figureheads for separate factions at court and that these ceremonies were intended to promote unity within the court in the run-up to war. Shortly afterwards, Ptolemy VI, now around sixteen, was declared an adult and celebrated his coming-of-age ceremony (the anakleteria). He was now ostensibly ruling in his own right, although in practice Eulaeus and Lenaeus remained in charge of the government.

The Sixth Syrian War broke out shortly after this, probably in early 169 BC. The Ptolemaic army set out from the border fort of Pelusium to invade Palestine, but was intercepted and defeated by Antiochus IV's army in the Sinai. Antiochus seized Pelusium and then pursued the Egyptians, who had withdrawn to the Nile Delta.

This defeat led to the collapse of the Ptolemaic government in Alexandria. Eulaeus attempted to send Ptolemy VI to the Aegean island of Samothrace with the Ptolemaic treasury. Before this could happen, two prominent Ptolemaic generals, Comanus and Cineas, launched a military coup and took control of the Egyptian government. As Antiochus IV advanced on Alexandria, Ptolemy VI went out to meet him. They negotiated an agreement of friendship, which in effect reduced Ptolemy VI to a Seleucid client. When news of the agreement reached Alexandria, the people of the city rioted. Comanus and Cineas rejected the agreement and Ptolemy VI's authority, declaring Ptolemy VIII the sole king (Cleopatra II's position remained unchanged). Antiochus IV responded by placing Alexandria under siege, but he was unable to take the city and withdrew from Egypt in September 169 BC, as winter approached, leaving Ptolemy VI as his puppet king in Memphis and retaining a garrison in Pelusium.

Within two months, Ptolemy VI had reconciled with Ptolemy VIII and Cleopatra II and returned to Alexandria. The restored government repudiated the agreement that Ptolemy VI had made with Antiochus IV, and began to recruit new troops from Greece. In response, Antiochus IV invaded Egypt for a second time in the spring of 168 BC. Officially, this invasion was presented as an effort to restore Ptolemy VI's position against his younger brother. Antiochus IV quickly occupied Memphis, where he was crowned king of Egypt, and advanced on Alexandria. He left the country for unknown reasons, but came back shortly afterwards as Ptolemy VI started to cooperate with his brother. However, the Ptolemies had appealed to Rome for help over the winter; a Roman embassy led by Gaius Popillius Laenas confronted Antiochus IV at the town of Eleusis and forced him to agree to a settlement, bringing the war to an end.

=== Rebellions and expulsion (168–164 BC) ===
The joint rule of the two brothers and Cleopatra II continued in the immediate aftermath of the war. However, the complete failure of the Egyptian forces had left the Ptolemaic monarchy's prestige seriously diminished and caused a permanent rift between Ptolemy VI and Ptolemy VIII.

Between 168 and 164 BC, Dionysius Petosarapis, a prominent courtier who appears to have been of native Egyptian origin, attempted to exploit the conflict in order to take control of the government. He went to the stadium and announced to the people of Alexandria that Ptolemy VI was plotting to assassinate Ptolemy VIII. Ptolemy VI managed to convince his younger brother that the charges were untrue and the two kings appeared together in the stadium, defusing the crisis. Dionysius fled the city and convinced some military contingents to mutiny. Heavy fighting took place in the Fayyum over the next year the connection of which to Dionysius is unknown. Another, apparently unrelated, rebellion broke out simultaneously in the Thebaid, the latest in a series of native Egyptian uprisings against Ptolemaic rule. Ptolemy VI successfully suppressed the rebellion after a bitter siege at Panopolis.

Owing to the preceding years of conflict, many farms had been abandoned, threatening the government's agricultural revenue. In autumn 165 BC the Ptolemies issued a royal decree, On Agriculture, which attempted to force land back into cultivation. The measure was very unpopular and prompted widespread protests. A new branch of government, the Idios Logos (Special Account), was established to manage estates that had become royal property as a result of confiscation or abandonment.

Late in 164 BC, probably not long after Ptolemy VI had returned from the south, Ptolemy VIII, who was now about twenty years old, somehow expelled Ptolemy VI and Cleopatra II from power – the exact course of events is not known. Ptolemy VI fled to Rome for help, traveling with only a eunuch and three servants. In Rome, he seems to have received nothing, and for accommodation had a poor room in an attic, offered by and shared with a painter of personal acquaintance. From there he moved on to Cyprus, which remained under his control.

== Second reign (163–145 BC) ==
In summer 163 BC, the people of Alexandria rioted against Ptolemy VIII, expelling him in turn and recalling Ptolemy VI. The restored king decided to come to an agreement with his younger brother and granted him control of Cyrenaica. This may have been done at the instigation of a pair of Roman agents present in Alexandria at the time. Egypt fell under the joint rule of Ptolemy VI and Cleopatra II; they were mentioned together in all official documents. This system of co-rule, which would be the norm for most of the rest of the Ptolemaic dynasty, was inaugurated by an amnesty decree and a royal visit to Memphis to celebrate the Egyptian new year festival.

=== Conflicts with Ptolemy VIII and the Seleucids ===
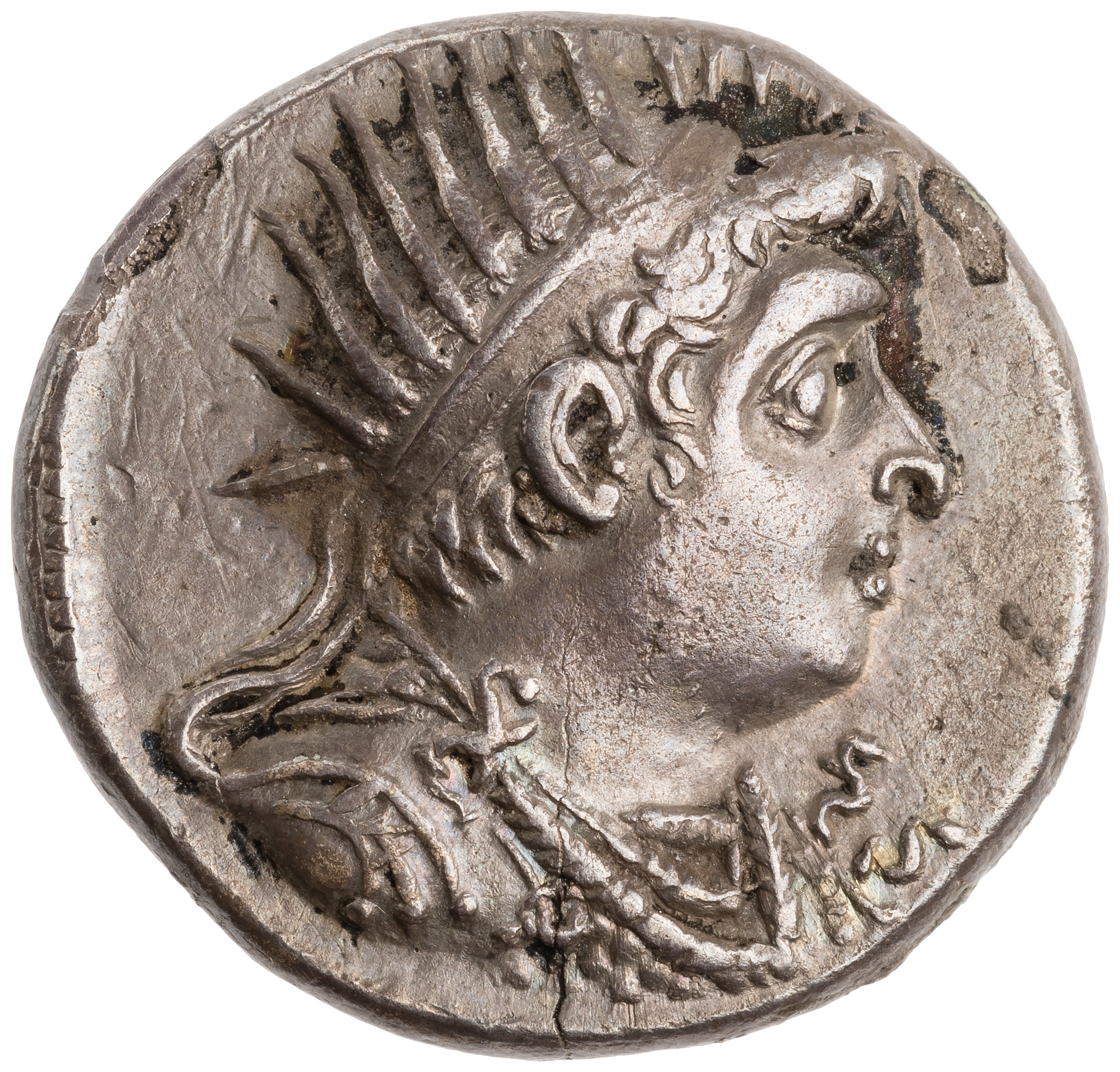
Coin of Ptolemy VIII

Ptolemy VIII was not satisfied with Cyrenaica and went to Rome in late 163 or early 162 BC to request help. The Roman Senate agreed that the division was unfair, declaring that Ptolemy VIII ought to receive Cyprus as well. Titus Manlius Torquatus and Gnaeus Cornelius Merula were sent as envoys to force Ptolemy VI to concede this, but he procrastinated and obfuscated. On their return to Rome at the end of 162 BC, they convinced the Senate to abandon their alliance with Ptolemy VI and to grant Ptolemy VIII permission to use force to take control of Cyprus. The Senate offered him no actual support in this endeavour and Cyprus remained in Ptolemy VI's hands.

In 162 BC, Ptolemy VI was also involved in a scheme to destabilise the Seleucid kingdom. His agents in Rome helped the king's cousin Demetrius I escape from captivity and return to Syria to seize control of the Seleucid empire from the under-age king Antiochus V. Once Demetrius I was in power, however, their interests began to diverge and the prospect of war between the two kingdoms returned. In 158 or 154 BC, Ptolemy VI's governor of Cyprus, Archias, attempted to sell the island to Demetrius I for 500 talents, but he was caught and hanged himself before this plot came to fruition.

In 154 BC, after surviving an assassination attempt which he blamed on his brother, Ptolemy VIII again appealed for assistance against Ptolemy VI to the Roman Senate. The Senate agreed to send a second embassy led by Gnaeus Cornelius Merula and Lucius Minucius Thermus, equipped with troops, in order to enforce the transfer of Cyprus to his control. In response, Ptolemy VI besieged his younger brother at Lapethus and captured him, with the help of the Cretan League. He persuaded Ptolemy VIII to withdraw from Cyprus, in exchange for continued possession of Cyrenaica, an annual payment of grain, and a promise of marriage to one of his infant daughters (probably Cleopatra Thea) once she came of age.

As a result of the conflict with his brother, Ptolemy VI made particular efforts to advance his eldest son Ptolemy Eupator as heir. The young prince was made priest of Alexander and the royal cult in 158 BC, when he was only eight years old. At age fourteen, in spring 152 BC, Ptolemy Eupator was promoted to full co-regent alongside his parents, but he died in autumn of the same year. This left the succession very uncertain, since Ptolemy VI's remaining son was very young. He began advancing his daughter Cleopatra III, formally deifying her in 146 BC.

=== Intervention in Syria (152–145 BC) ===
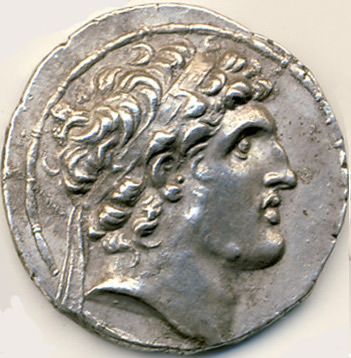
Coin of Alexander Balas

A new claimant to the Seleucid throne, Alexander Balas, appeared in 153 BC. John Grainger proposes that Ptolemy VI provided Alexander with financial backing, naval transport, and secured Ptolemais Akko as a landing base for him. He argues that Alexander's chancellor Ammonius should be seen as a Ptolemaic agent. There is however no explicit evidence for this, and Boris Chrubasik presents Alexander's initial successes as accomplished without any Ptolemaic involvement, and challenges the identification of Ammonius as an Egyptian in particular. At any rate, an agreement between Ptolemy VI and Alexander was sealed in 150 BC, when Ptolemy VI married his teenage daughter Cleopatra Thea to Alexander in a ceremony at Ptolemais Akko.

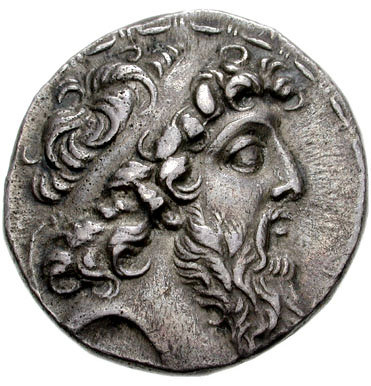
Coin of Demetrius II

By May 146 BC, however, Ptolemy VI was gathering troops. In 145 BC he invaded Syria while Alexander was putting down a rebellion in Cilicia. Alexander's vassal Jonathan Maccabee allowed Ptolemy VI to pass through Judaea without interference. Ostensibly, Ptolemy VI acted in support of Alexander against the latest claimant of the Seleucid throne, Demetrius II. In practice, Ptolemy VI's intervention came at a heavy cost; he took control of all the Seleucid cities along the coast, including Seleucia Pieria. He may also have started minting his own coinage in the Syrian cities.

While he was at Ptolemais Akko, however, Ptolemy VI switched sides. According to Josephus, he discovered a plot against his life by Alexander's chancellor Ammonius. When Ptolemy VI demanded that Ammonius be punished, Alexander refused. Ptolemy VI remarried his daughter to Demetrius II and continued his march northward. The commanders of Antioch, Diodotus and Hierax, surrendered the city to Ptolemy and crowned him king of Asia. For a short period, documents referred to him as King of Egypt and Asia, and he initiated a double regnal count, with his Egyptian Year 36 = his Syrian Year 1. However, fearing that a unification of the Ptolemaic and Seleucid kingdoms would lead to Roman intervention, Ptolemy VI decided to abandon the title. Instead, he limited himself to annexing Coele Syria and pledged to serve as a "tutor in goodness and guide" to Demetrius II.

Alexander returned from Cilicia with his army, but Ptolemy VI and Demetrius II defeated his forces at the Oenoparas river. Alexander then fled to Arabia, where he was killed. His severed head was brought to Ptolemy VI. For the first time since the death of Alexander the Great, Egypt and Syria were united. However, Ptolemy VI had been wounded in the battle and he died three days later. By late 145, Demetrius II had expelled all Ptolemaic troops from Syria and reasserted Seleucid control by leading his own forces all the way down to the Egyptian border. Ptolemy VI seems to have intended for his seven-year-old son, also named Ptolemy, to succeed him, but instead the Alexandrians invited Ptolemy VIII to assume the throne. Young Ptolemy was eventually eliminated by his uncle, apparently only after 143 BC, when he served as eponymous priest, and perhaps as late as 132/1 BC.

== Regime ==
=== Pharaonic ideology and Egyptian religion ===
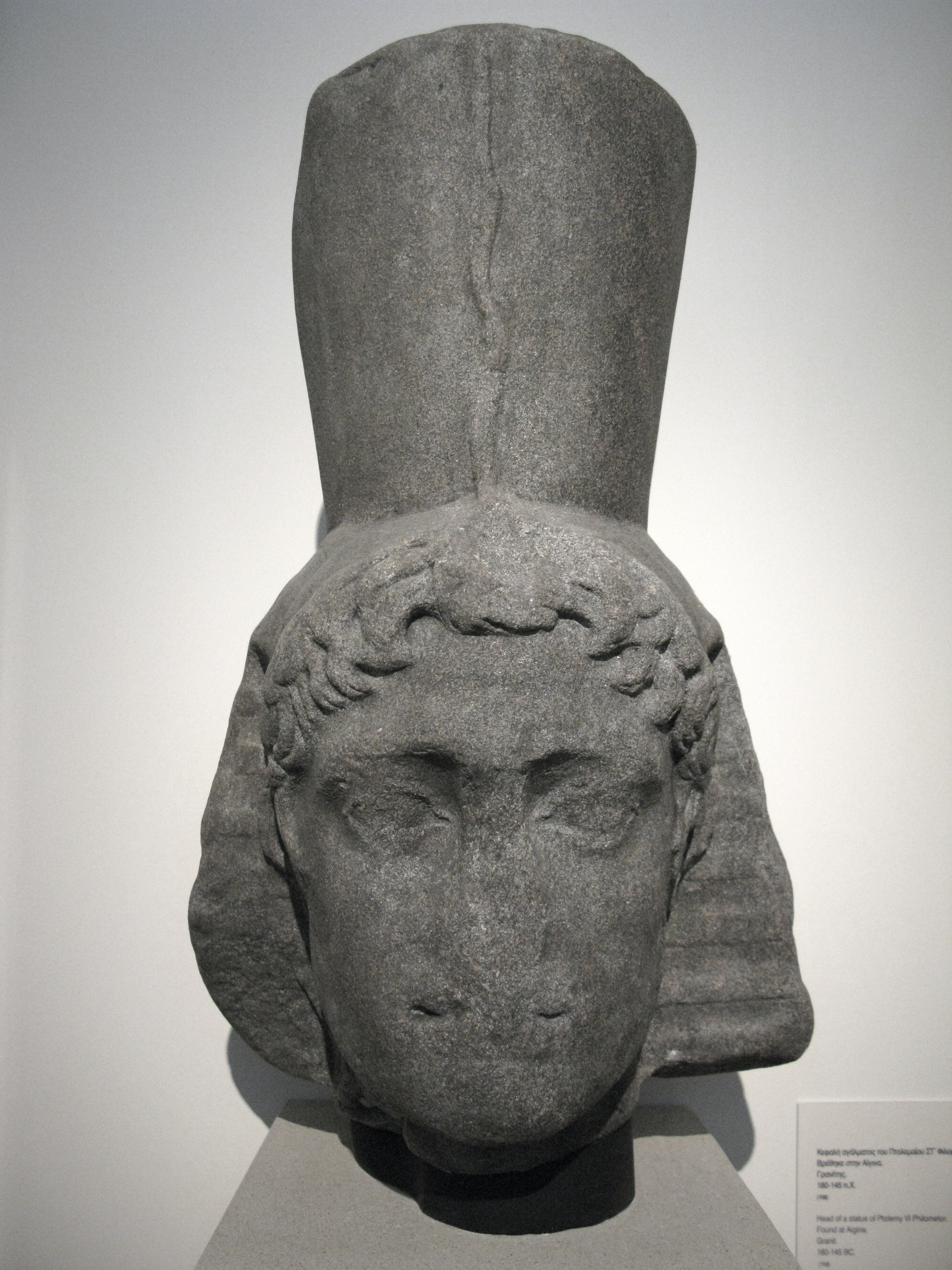
Depiction of Ptolemy VI as pharaoh, found in the sea near Aegina

Like his predecessors, Ptolemy VI fully embraced his role as pharaoh and maintained a mutually beneficial relationship with the traditional Egyptian priesthood. In particular, he maintained close ties with the worship of Ptah and Apis at Memphis. Ptolemy VI and Cleopatra II seem to have visited Memphis and stayed in the Serapeum there for the Egyptian New Year festival every year. During these visits, Ptolemy VI personally made the ritual temple offerings expected of the pharaoh.

In summer 161 BC, Ptolemy VI and Cleopatra II gathered a synod of all the priests of Egypt in order to pass a decree granting tax relief and other benefactions to the priests in exchange for cultic honours in Egyptian temples – part of a series of decrees that had been issued under each of his predecessors, going back to Ptolemy III. The decree survives only on one fragmentary stele known as CG 22184. Other inscriptions record specific benefactions made at various points during the reign. In September 157 BC, Ptolemy VI affirmed the grant of all the tax revenue from the Dodecaschoenus region to the Temple of Isis at Philae, first made by his predecessor. The grant is recorded in the Dodecaschoenus decree. Around 145 BC, he granted the tribute from a Nubian leader to the priests of Mandulis at Philae.

=== Relations with the Jews ===
The Jewish historian Josephus emphasises Ptolemy VI's personal interest in the Jews and their well-being. There had been a Jewish community in Egypt since at least the fifth century BC and it had grown significantly since the establishment of Ptolemaic control over Jerusalem in 311 BC. By Ptolemy VI's reign, Jews had long been incorporated into the Ptolemaic army, and they enjoyed various privileges comparable to those possessed by Greeks and Macedonians in Egypt. A large group of new Jewish immigrants arrived in Egypt in the 160s BC, fleeing civil conflict with the Maccabees. This group was led by Onias IV, son of a former high priest who had been deposed by the Seleucids. Ptolemy VI permitted them to settle at Leontopolis, which became known as the Land of Onias, and to establish a temple with Onias as High Priest. The place is still known as Tell al-Jahudija (Hill of the Jews) today. Onias was also granted an important military position and his family became prominent members of the royal court. In Alexandria the Jews had their own quarter of the city with its own politeuma – a kind of self-governing community within the city, led by their own ethnarch. It is likely that this politeuma was established under Ptolemy VI.

=== Relations with Nubia ===
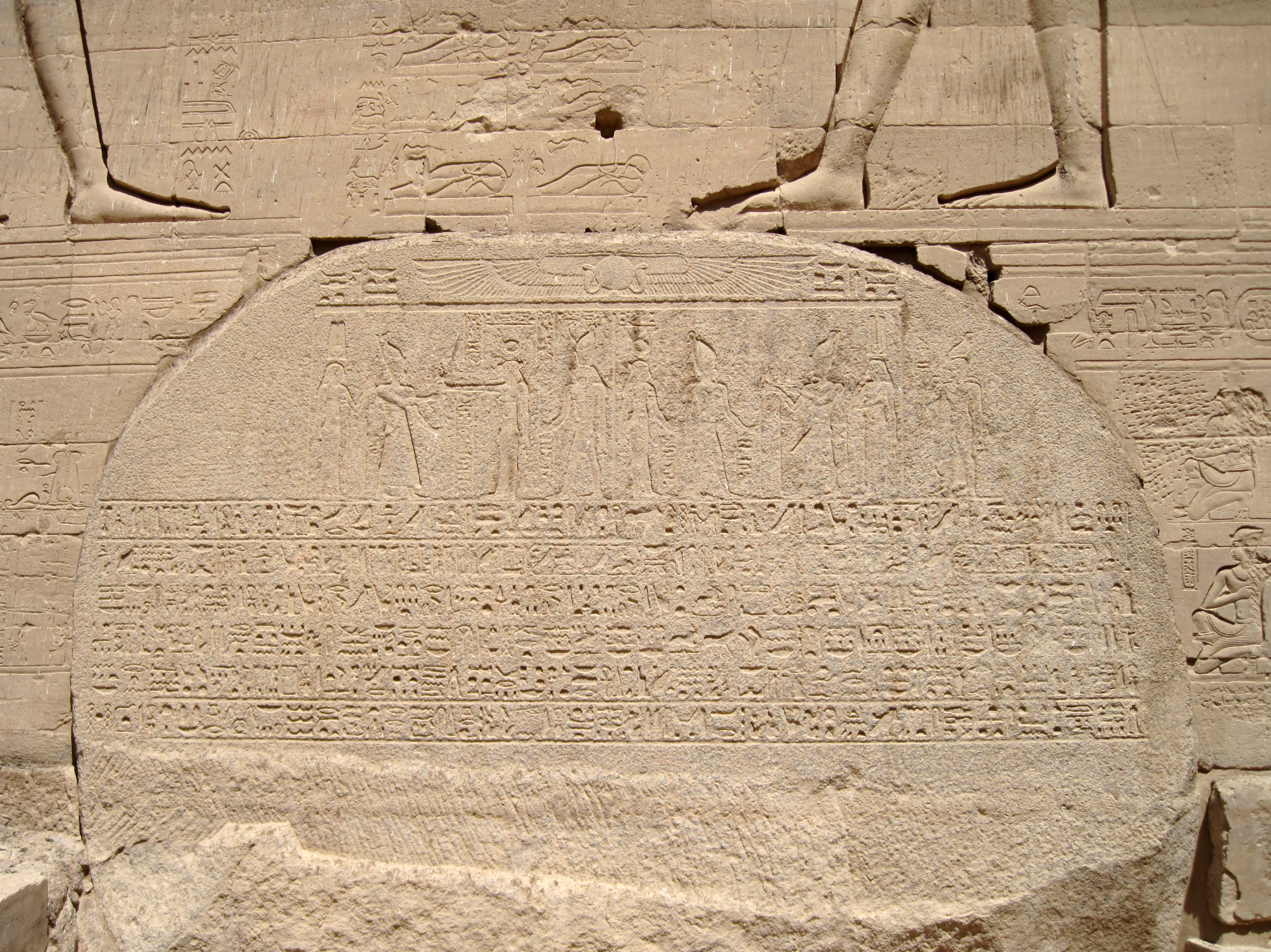
Stele of Ptolemy VI at Philae, recording the grant of tax revenues to the Temple of Isis

Until the reign of Ptolemy IV, the Ptolemies had controlled the region south of Aswan to the second cataract, which was known as the Triacontaschoenus or Lower Nubia and included rich gold mines. Throughout the 160s and 150s BC, Ptolemy VI reasserted Ptolemaic control over the northern part of Nubia. This achievement is heavily advertised at the Temple of Isis at Philae, which was granted the tax revenues of the Dodecaschoenus region in 157 BC. Decorations on the first pylon of the Temple of Isis at Philae emphasise the Ptolemaic claim to rule the whole of Nubia. The aforementioned inscription regarding the priests of Mandulis shows that some Nubian leaders at least were paying tribute to the Ptolemaic treasury in this period. In order to secure the region, the strategos of Upper Egypt, Boethus, founded two new cities, named Philometris and Cleopatra in honour of the royal couple.

== Marriage and issue ==
Ptolemy VI and his sister-wife, Cleopatra II, had the following issue:

Name	Image	Birth	Death	Notes
Ptolemy Eupator		15 October 166 BC	August 152 BC	Briefly co-regent with his father in 152 BC.
Cleopatra Thea		c. 164 BC	121/0 BC	Married in succession to the Seleucid kings Alexander I, Demetrius II, and Antiochus VII. Eventually queen regnant of Seleucid Syria.
Cleopatra III		160–155 BC?	September 101 BC	Married her uncle Ptolemy VIII, ruled as senior co-regent with her sons Ptolemy IX and Ptolemy X from 116/5–101 BC.
Ptolemy		c. 152 BC	143/141 or 132/1 BC?	Survived his father but was eventually eliminated by his uncle, Ptolemy VIII. Traditionally, he was identified with his cousin and half-brother, Ptolemy VII Neos Philopator, who died in 132/131 BC and was deified under that name in 118 BC.
Berenice		160s BC?	Before 133 BC	Briefly engaged to Attalus III of Pergamum, her parentage and even her membership of the Ptolemaic dynasty is entirely hypothetical.

== Gallery ==
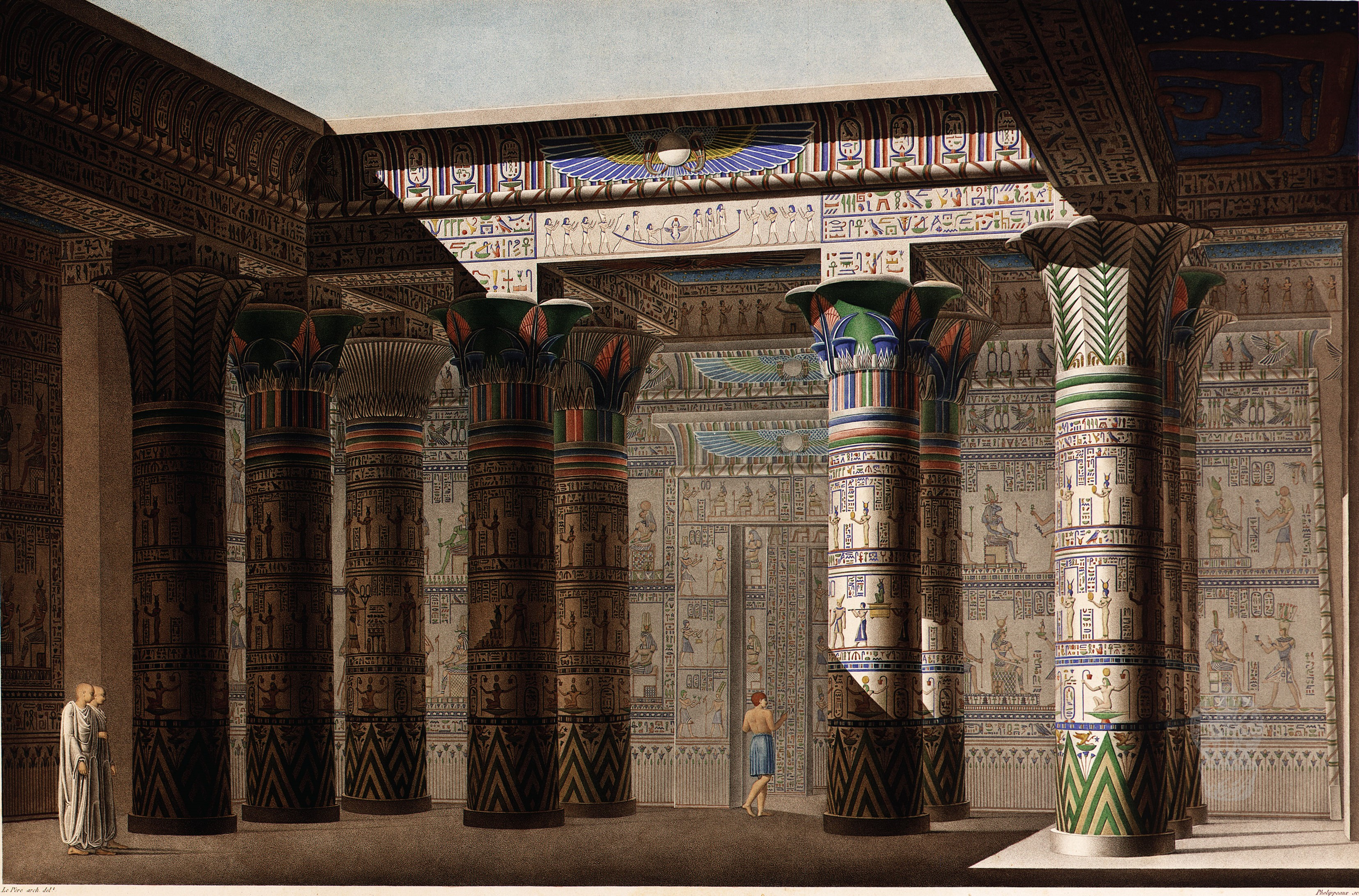
Inside the Temple of Philae; Description De L'Egypte Jean-Baptiste Lepère, 1821

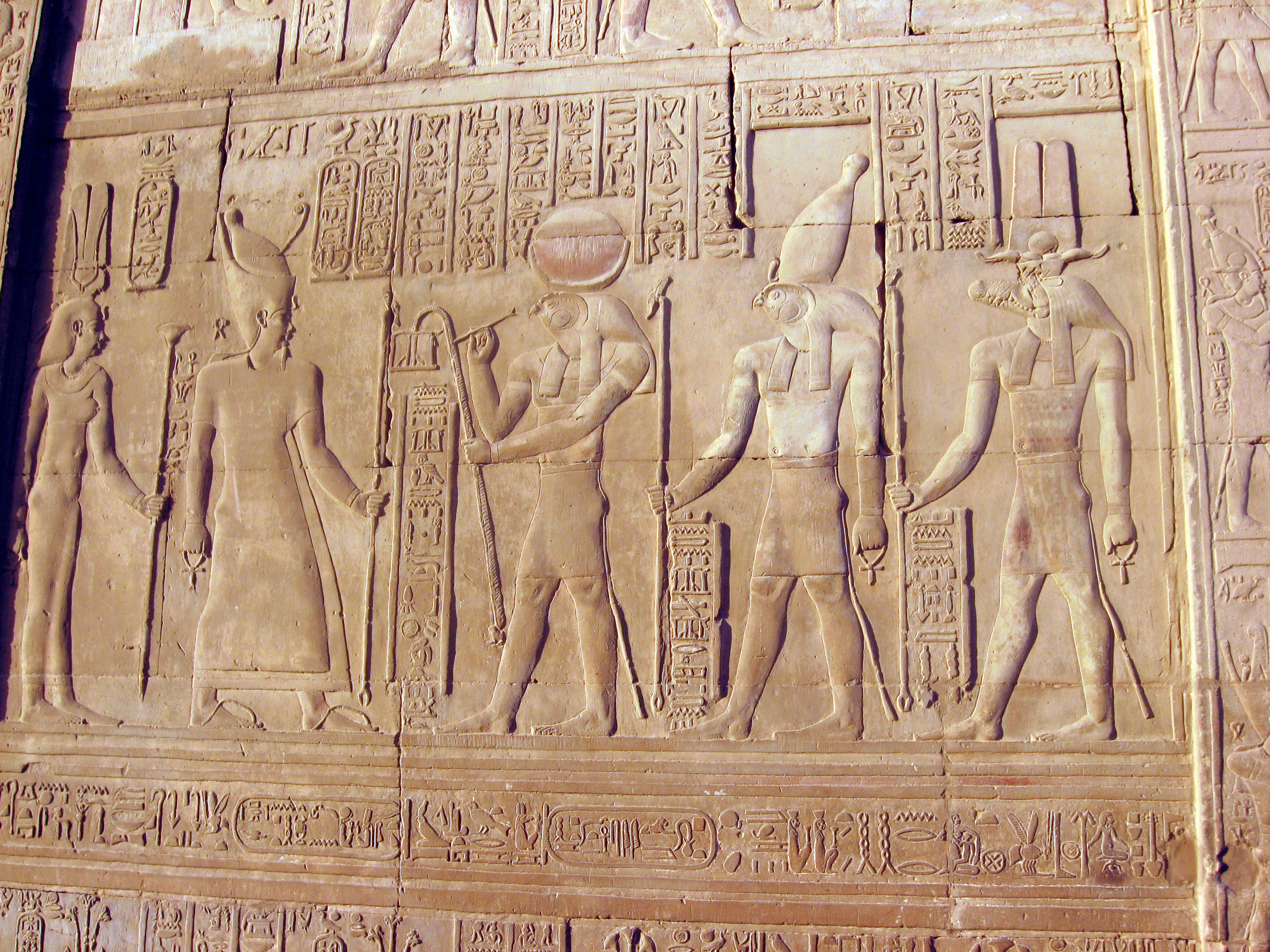
Kom Ombo, Ptolemy Philometor with his wife Cleopatra II before the gods Ra, Montu and Sobek

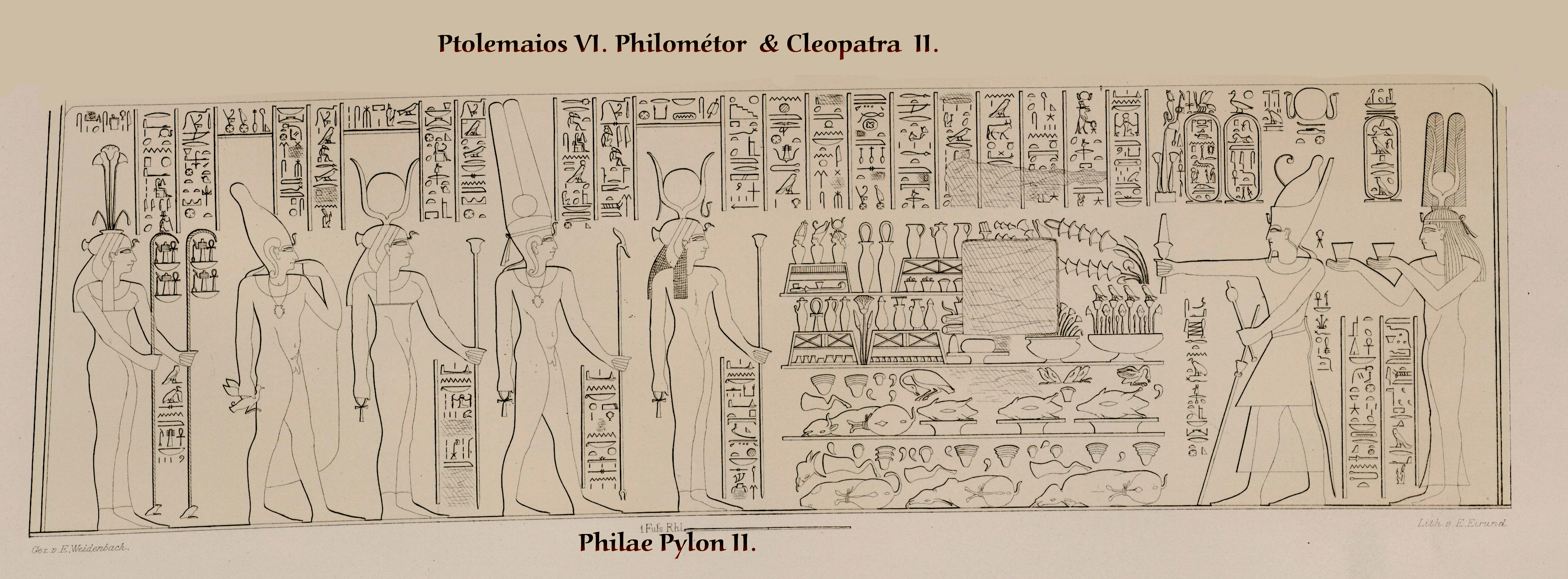
Ptolemy VI Philometor and his wife Cleopatra II bring offerings to the gods Hathor and Amun

== Bibliography ==
- Bielman, A., "Stéréotypes et réalités du pouvoir politique féminin: la guerre civile en Égypte entre 132 et 124 av. J.-C.," EuGeStA 7 (2017) 84-114.
- Chauveau, M., "Encore Ptolémée «VII» et le dieu Neos Philopatôr!," Revue d’Égyptologie 51 (2000) 257-261.
- Chrubasik, Boris (2016). Kings and Usurpers in the Seleukid Empire: The Men who would be King. Oxford: Oxford University Press. pp. 131–5. ISBN 9780198786924.
- Grainger, John D. (2010). The Syrian Wars. Brill. pp. 281–328. ISBN 9789004180505.
- Hölbl, Günther (2001). A History of the Ptolemaic Empire. London & New York: Routledge. pp. 143–152 & 181–194. ISBN 0415201454.
- Kainz, Lukas (2022). Die umstrittenen Könige: Untersuchungen zur Stabilität des ptolemäischen Königtums. Von der Thronbesteigung Ptolemaios’ II. bis zum Tod Ptolemaios’ VI. (283/82–145 v. Chr.) [The disputed kings: Studies on the stability of the Ptolemaic monarchy. From the accession of Ptolemy II to the death of Ptolemy VI (283/82–145 BC)]. Hamburg: Dr. Kovač. pp. 309–353. ISBN 978-3-339-13044-0.
- Morkholm, Otto (1961). "Eulaios and Lenaios". Classica et Medievalia. 22: 32–43.

Ptolemy VI Philometor Ptolemaic dynasty Born: c. 185 BC Died: 145 BC
Preceded by Ptolemy V Epiphanes; Cleopatra I	Ptolemaic King of Egypt with Cleopatra I Cleopatra II; Ptolemy VIII; 181–164 BC	Succeeded by Ptolemy VIII
Preceded by Ptolemy VIII	Ptolemaic King of Egypt with Cleopatra II; Ptolemy VIII; Ptolemy Eupator; 163–145 BC	Succeeded by Cleopatra II; Ptolemy VIII
