= Cleopatra II =

Queen of Ptolemaic Egypt

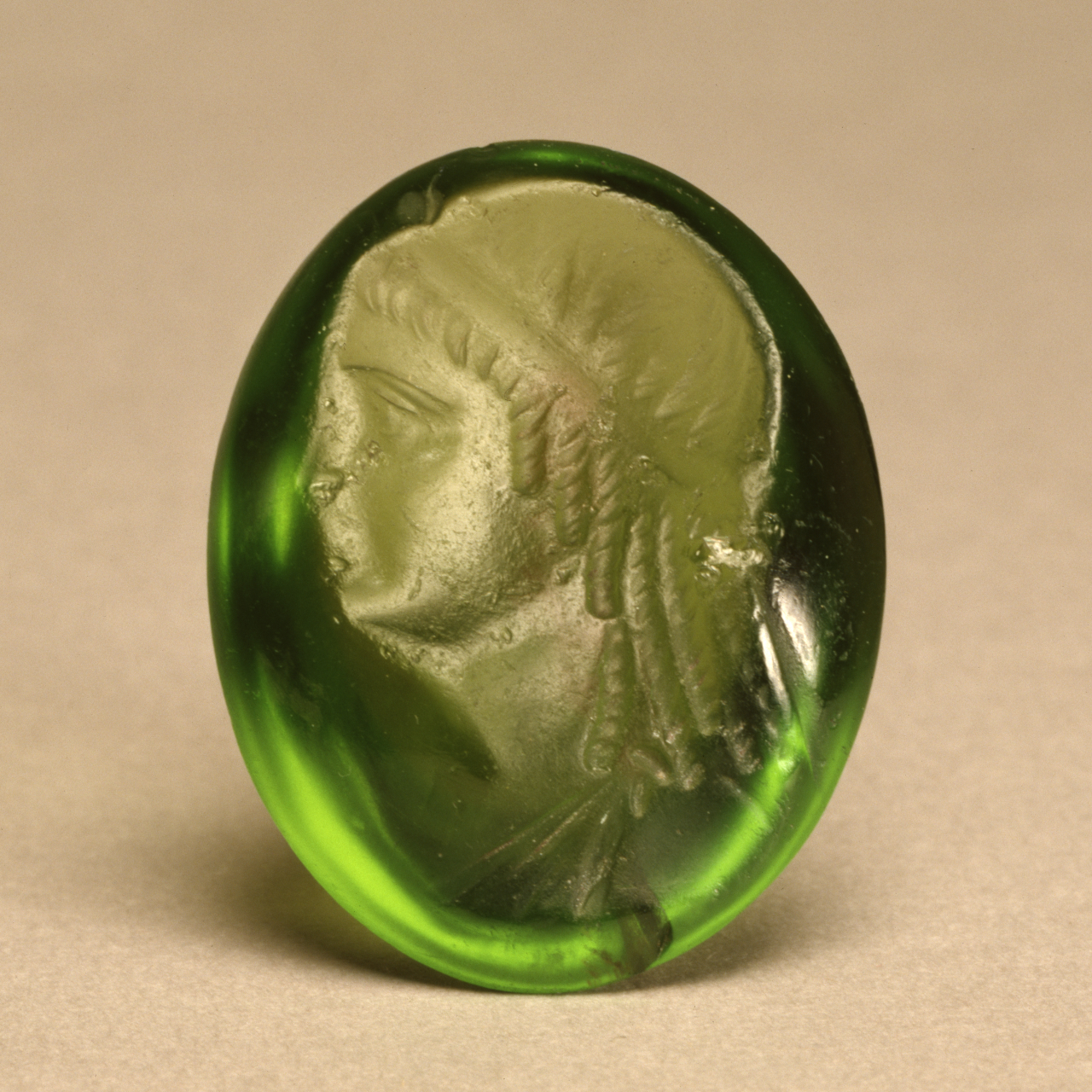

Pharaoh and Queen of the Ptolemaic Kingdom
- Reign: 175–170 BC (as consort); 170–164 BC; 163–127 BC (as sole monarch in 131–127 BC); 124–116/5 BC
- Coregency: Ptolemy VI (170–164, 163–145 BC); Ptolemy VIII Physcon (170–164, 145–132/1, 127–116 BC); Cleopatra III (140–132/1, 127–116 BC); Ptolemy IX Lathyros (116 BC)
Royal titulary
Nomen
Klaupadrat Netjeret Meretmut
Cleopatra, the goddess, beloved of Mut

G39 N5	q rw A wA p d r t A H8 nTr t mr mwt
- Consorts: Ptolemy VI of Egypt (m. 175 BC; died 145 BC); Ptolemy VIII of Egypt (m. 145 BC; died 116 BC)
- Children: Ptolemy Eupator; Cleopatra Thea, Queen of Syria; Berenice (possibly); Cleopatra III, Queen of Egypt; Ptolemy VII Neos Philopator
- Father: Ptolemy V of Egypt
- Mother: Cleopatra I of Egypt
- Born: c. 185 BC
- Died: 116/115 BC (aged 69)
- Dynasty: Ptolemaic dynasty

Cleopatra II Philometor Soteira (Greek: Κλεοπάτρα Φιλομήτωρ Σώτειρα, Kleopatra Philomētōr Sōteira; c. 185 BC – 116/115 BC) was Queen consort of Ptolemaic Egypt from 175 to 170 BC as wife of Ptolemy VI Philometor, and then Queen regnant from 170 BC as co-ruler with her two successive brother-husbands, her daughter, and her grandson.

She co-ruled during her first reign from 170 until 164 BC, with Ptolemy VI Philometor, her first husband and the older of her brothers, and Ptolemy VIII Euergetes II, her younger brother. During her second reign she co-ruled again with Ptolemy VI from 163 BC until his death in 145 BC. She then ruled with her younger brother, Ptolemy VIII, whom she married, and her daughter Cleopatra III. She was sole ruler of Egypt from 131 BC to 127 BC. Her final reign from 124 BC to 116/5 BC was also spent in coregency with Ptolemy VIII and Cleopatra III.

She was the first Ptolemaic queen known for certain to rule in her own right, and thus first confirmed female Pharaoh of Egypt since Tausret's reign during New Kingdom period.

== Life ==
=== Early life (before 175 BC) ===
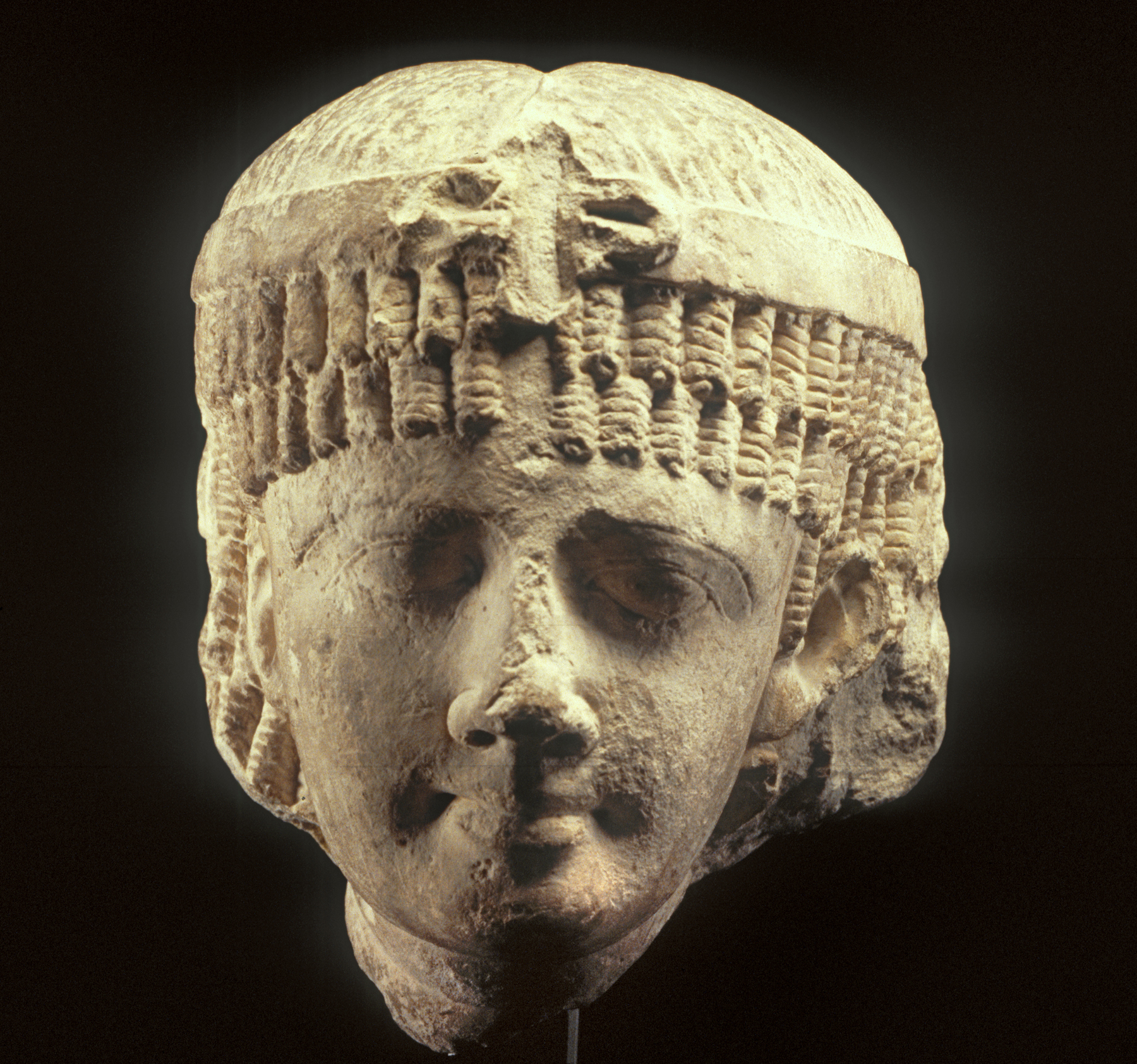
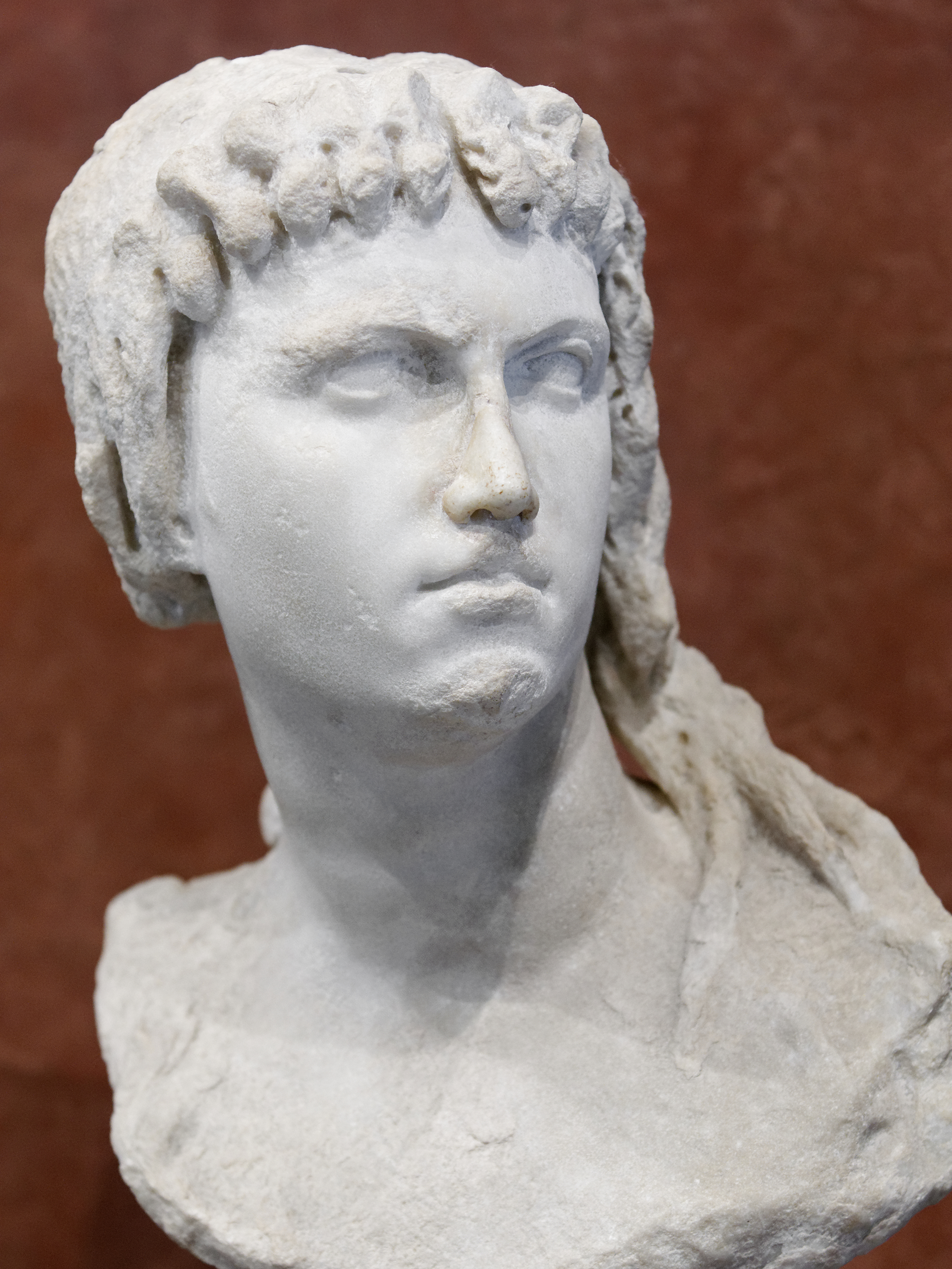
These busts of a Ptolemaic Egyptian queen likely depict Cleopatra II or her daughter Cleopatra III. (Left image from Walters Art Museum, Baltimore; Right image from the Louvre Museum, Paris)

Cleopatra II was the daughter of Ptolemy V and likely Cleopatra I. If she was the daughter of Cleopatra I, she was a full sister of Ptolemy VI Philometor and Ptolemy VIII Euergetes II Tryphon; otherwise she was their half-sister. She would eventually marry both of her brothers, in turn.

=== Consort and first co-regency (175–131 BC) ===
Following the death of their mother, Cleopatra I, in 177/6 BC, Cleopatra II was married to her brother Ptolemy VI Philometor in c. 175 BC, thus becoming Queen consort of Egypt, but she was declared formal co-regent with Ptolemy VI and their younger brother, Ptolemy VIII Euergetes Physcon, in 170 BC; trio continued to reign together until 164 BC. The year Cleopatra II's reign began is considered by Sally-Ann Ashton to be 175 BC, the year of her marriage, but by Tara Sewell-Lasater to be 170 BC, when Ptolemy VIII also became co-ruler. Based on the former, Cleopatra II is said to have reigned for 57 years.

By becoming nominal co-ruler, Cleopatra II became first known Queen regnant of Ptolemaic dynasty.

In 169–168 BC, the siblings' maternal uncle Antiochus IV of Syria invaded Egypt. Ptolemy VI Philometor briefly joined Antiochus IV outside Alexandria in 169 BC, then turned against him in alliance with his siblings. Antiochus IV was finally induced to give up his attempt to take over Egypt by Roman intervention. In 164 BC Cleopatra II and her husband were temporarily deposed by Ptolemy VIII, but were restored to power in 163 BC. After this, Ptolemy VIII was removed from the co-regency in Egypt and made king of Cyrene.

Ptolemy VI died on campaign in Syria in 145 BC. Cleopatra II agreed to marry her younger brother, Ptolemy VIII Euergetes II Physcon, who ascended the throne. According to Justin, Ptolemy VIII murdered Ptolemy, the surviving son of Ptolemy VI and Cleopatra II, on his marriage to Cleopatra II, but new evidence shows he survived as a potential heir and served as eponymous priest of Alexander the Great in c. 143 BC; he was eliminated by his uncle sometime later. Cleopatra II bore Ptolemy VIII a new heir, Ptolemy Memphites, in c. 143 BC.

Between 142 BC and 139 BC Ptolemy VIII married Cleopatra's younger daughter, his niece Cleopatra III. She quickly produced two sons, the future kings Ptolemy IX Soter and Ptolemy XI Alexander, and three daughters. These developments are assumed to have increased the pre-existing rivalry between Cleopatra II and Ptolemy VIII.

=== Sole reign (132/1–127 BC) ===
Cleopatra II led a rebellion against Ptolemy VIII in 132/1 BC, and drove him and Cleopatra III out of Alexandria at the end of 131 BC. At this time Ptolemy VIII is said to have had Ptolemy Memphites, his son by his older sister, Cleopatra II, dismembered and his head, hands and feet sent to Cleopatra II in Alexandria as a birthday present.

Cleopatra II ruled in Alexandria as sole ruler until 127 BC. Ptolemy VIII had retained the allegiance of parts of Egypt and gradually expanded his control from there. In 127 BC, he took over Alexandria, Cleopatra II being forced to flee to Syria, where she joined her daughter Cleopatra Thea and her son-in-law Demetrius II Nicator. The latter was unable to offer effective support to his mother-in-law, as Ptolemy VIII pitted against him a rival for the Seleucid throne.

=== Second co-regency (124–116/5 BC) ===
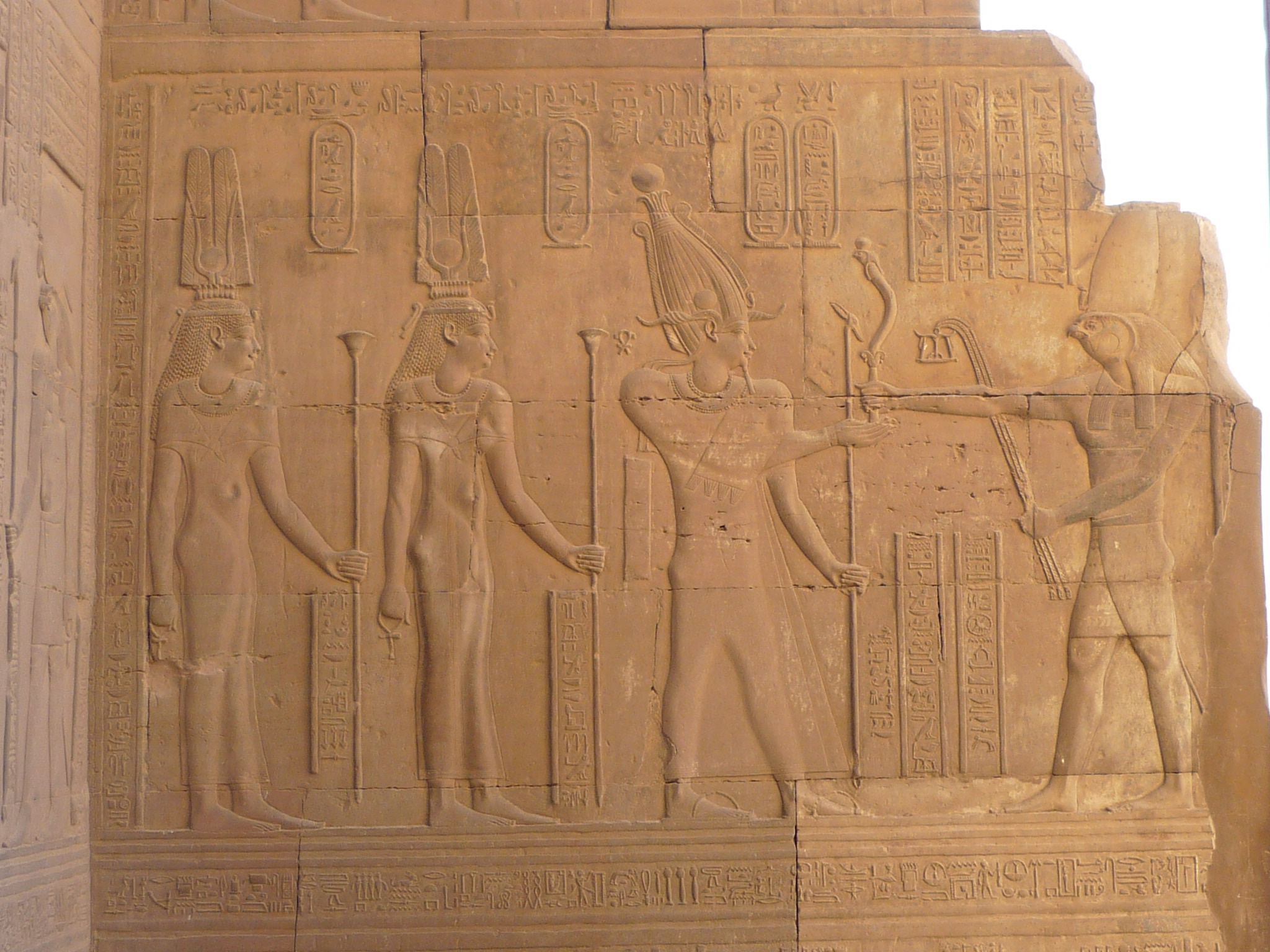
Wall relief of Cleopatra III, Cleopatra II and Ptolemy VIII before Horus

A public reconciliation of Cleopatra II and Ptolemy VIII was declared in 124 BC. After this she ruled jointly with her brother and daughter until June 116 BC when Ptolemy died. Among amnesty decrees seeking to heal the conflicts stirred by the recent civil war, Cleopatra II's murdered son Ptolemy Memphites was deified as the God Neos Philopator in 118 BC.

Ptolemy VIII left the kingdom to be ruled by Cleopatra III and one of their sons. At the wishes of the Alexandrians, Cleopatra III chose Ptolemy Lathyros, her elder son, as her co-ruler. However, Cleopatra II retained seniority in the ruling triumvirate.

Cleopatra II disappeared from historical records sometime around October 116 BC. She is believed to have died in about 116 or 115 BC.

== Issue ==
With Ptolemy VI she had at least four children, and possibly an additional daughter Berenice:

- Ptolemy Eupator, born in 166 BC. Became co-regent with his father for a short time, but died at a young age in c. 152 BC.
- Cleopatra Thea, born in c. 164 BC. She married Alexander Balas, Demetrius II Nicator and Antiochus VII Sidetes. Murdered by her son in c. 120 BC.
- Perhaps Berenice, born between 163 and 160 BC. Died young in c. 150 BC.
- Cleopatra III, born between 160 and 155 BC. Married to her uncle Ptolemy VIII.
- Ptolemy, born c. 152 BC. Murdered after 143 BC by Ptolemy VIII.

With Ptolemy VIII she is thought to have had at least one son,

- Ptolemy Memphites, born between 144 and 142 BC. According to recent research, Ptolemy Memphites is identical to Ptolemy Neos Philopator, deified in 118 BC.

== Epithet ==
- Cleopatra II was titled Philometor ("Mother-loving [Goddess]") as spouse of her brother and co-ruler Ptolemy VI Philometor, in 175–164 and 163–145 BC.
- Cleopatra II was titled Euergetis ("Benefactor [Goddess]") as spouse of her brother and co-ruler Ptolemy VIII Euergetes Physcon, in 145–132/1 and 124–116 BC.
- Cleopatra II was titled Philometor Soteira ("Mother-loving Savior [Goddess]") during her sole reign in 132/1–127 BC and again as senior monarch in 116–116/5 BC.

== Bibliography ==
- Bielman, A., "Stéréotypes et réalités du pouvoir politique féminin: la guerre civile en Égypte entre 132 et 124 av. J.-C.," EuGeStA 7 (2017) 84–114.
- Chauveau, M., "Encore Ptolémée «VII» et le dieu Neos Philopatôr!," Revue d'Égyptologie 51 (2000) 257–261.
- Dodson, A., and D. Hilton, The Complete Royal Families of Ancient Egypt, London, 2004.
- Errington, R. M., A History of the Hellenistic World 323-30 BC, Malden, MA, 2008.
- Green, P., From Alexander to Actium: The Historical Evolution of the Hellenistic Age, Berkeley, 1990.
- Hölbl, G., A History of the Ptolemaic Empire, London, 2001.

Cleopatra II Ptolemaic dynasty Born: ca. 185 BC Died: 115 BC
Regnal titles
Preceded by Cleopatra I	Queen consort of Egypt; 175 BC – 170 BC	Succeeded by vacant, Pharaoh Cleopatra III as co-ruling Royal wife
Preceded by Ptolemy VI	Pharaoh of Egypt; 170 BC – 164 BC with Ptolemy VI and Ptolemy VIII	Succeeded by Ptolemy VIII
Preceded by Ptolemy VIII	Pharaoh of Egypt; 163 BC – 127 BC with Ptolemy VI, Ptolemy VIII and Cleopatra III	Succeeded by Ptolemy VIII and Cleopatra III
Preceded by Ptolemy VIII and Cleopatra III	Pharaoh of Egypt; 127 BC – 116/5 BC with Ptolemy VIII, Cleopatra III and Ptolemy IX	Succeeded by Ptolemy IX and Cleopatra III
