= The Cleopatras =

1983 BBC Television historical drama serial

- Genre: Historical drama
- Written by: Philip Mackie
- Directed by: John Frankau
- Starring: Michelle Newell; Graham Crowden; Richard Griffiths; Robert Hardy; Elizabeth Shepherd
- Theme music composer: Nick Bicât
- Country of origin: United Kingdom
- No. of episodes: 8

Production
- Producer: Guy Slater
- Running time: 50 min
- Production company: BBC

Original release
- Network: BBC2
- Release: 19 January – 9 March 1983

The Cleopatras is a 1983 BBC Television eight-part historical drama serial. Written by Philip Mackie, it is set in Ancient Egypt during the latter part of the Ptolemaic Dynasty with an emphasis on the Cleopatras. Intended to be the I, Claudius of the 1980s, The Cleopatras met with a decidedly mixed critical reaction, and was regarded and portrayed as a gaudy farce. It also produced a number of complaints due to scenes of nudity.

The title and incidental music was written and composed by Nick Bicât. In January 1983 a 7" vinyl was released to tie in with the original broadcast.

Although the show has never been rebroadcast or released on DVD, clips were featured in a 2015 BBC documentary about how Cleopatra VII has been depicted and presented in film and on television.

== Synopsis ==
=== 145 BC ===
Alexandria, 145 BC. Upon the death in battle of her husband and brother King Ptolemy VI, Queen Cleopatra II has to marry her younger brother, Ptolemy, to remain on the throne. Ptolemy secretly orders the murder of his nephew and heir, Eupator, the son of his wife and their brother, the late King, then impregnates his new wife with a new child (it turns out to be a boy, whom they call Memphites), and then rapes Eupator's sister, his step-daughter and niece Cleopatra III, his wife's own daughter, who becomes pregnant by him, so he decides to divorce her mother and marries her instead. They rule as an uneasy triumvirate. Ptolemy and Cleopatra III are driven out of Egypt by the mob. Ptolemy takes revenge on his sister Cleopatra II by murdering their only son Memphites, his sister's only male child and heir, and sending her his dismembered corpse as a birthday present.

=== 128 BC ===
Ptolemy and Cleopatra III re-invade Egypt, banishing Cleopatra II to Syria, where her daughter Cleopatra Thea is queen consort, but is constantly displeased with the reign of her incompetent husband, King Demetrius. Cleopatra seeks the aid of Demetrius in regaining her throne, but when he fails, his wife orders his slaughter in a temple where he has sought refuge. Her intention is to proclaim herself queen regnant, and her favourite younger son Grypus a puppet co-ruler, but she is forestalled by her elder son Seleucus, who proclaims himself king instead, allowing her to be only the Queen Mother of Syria. She tries to make a puppet ruler of him instead, but when he resists her influence she poisons him at the dinner table. After his death, Grypus finally becomes King of Syria, but with time comes to dislike his mother's increasing desire for power and influence over him.

Meanwhile, Ptolemy announces a sudden change of character - henceforth he is to be known as Ptolemy the Benign. He makes up with his sister Cleopatra II and allows her to return to Egypt from Syria and be a queen once more, much to the dislike of his wife and co-ruler, Queen Cleopatra III, who still sees her mother as a rival. Cleopatra III and Ptolemy's eldest son and daughter, Chickpea and Cleopatra IV, get married, again to Cleopatra's great dislike (because they are in love with each other, but she hates him because he is a product of rape), and their second daughter, Cleopatra Tryphaena, is married to her cousin Grypus, who then, persuaded by her, begins to resist his mother's influence. When his mother tries to kill him, he forces her to drink the poison and she dies.

=== 115 BC ===
Finally, Queen Cleopatra II dies peacefully in her bed, and her brother, King Ptolemy, leaves on his own deathbed a will which he designed to cause mayhem among his family. His wife Cleopatra III is named as his successor, but she chooses her favourite younger son, Alexander, to share the throne with her. The mob dislikes that, because Alexander is not the eldest son, so she has no alternative but to proclaim her elder son Chickpea, whom she loathes, King of Egypt instead, but proceeds to divorce him from her eldest daughter Cleopatra IV, with whom he already has a daughter, Cleopatra Berenike, and to marry her youngest daughter Cleopatra Selene to him instead, making her, and not the firstborn Cleopatra IV, wife of the king and thus queen consort of Egypt. After that she exiles Cleopatra IV, who tries to get support with her younger brother Alexander, who is now governor of Cyprus; when she fails, she goes to the court of her cousin Grypus and her sister Tryphaena, who receives orders from her mother to put Cleopatra to death. Cleopatra doublecrosses Grypus and uses her army to help Grypus's brother and rival to the throne, Cyzicenus, who marries her and makes her Queen of Syria, so when the civil war in Syria takes another turn, Grypus and Tryphaena capture Cleopatra IV and Tryphaena has her killed. Some time later, the war in Syria again takes different turn, and Queen Cleopatra Tryphaena gets captured by her brother-in-law Cyzicenus, who takes revenge upon her for killing his wife, and slowly and painfully kills her. In the meanwhile, Queen Cleopatra III and her daughter, Queen Cleopatra Selene, arrange for Chickpea to be driven out of the kingdom by an angry mob, whom they convince that Chickpea tried to kill his mother. Chickpea flees Egypt and goes to Cyprus, while Alexander finally becomes his mother's co-ruler, whom she treats as a puppet. Selene is married to the widowed King Grypus of Syria, her cousin and ex-brother-in-law, and Cleopatra III forces Alexander to marry his niece Cleopatra Berenike, Chickpea and Cleopatra IV's young daughter. When hearing of this, his secret wife in Cyprus, with whom he even had a son, takes her own life. When Alexander receives the news, he finally stands up to his mother and tries to suffocate her, but fails, only to be helped by the young, but very ambitious Cleopatra Berenike, his niece and chosen bride-to-be, who wants above everything else to become the ruling queen of Egypt, who finishes her grandmother off with a cushion.

=== 100 BC ===
Cleopatra Berenike plots to be rid of Alexander who has turned to drink. Egypt's province of Cyrenaica is willed to Rome on the death of Apion, and Alexander does nothing, against the wishes of his generals. The army defies the King, who attempts to raise a new army of Syrian mercenaries to be paid with gold from the Tomb of Alexander the Great. When the city is outraged at the desecration of the tomb, Alexander flees but is pursued and killed. Chickpea reclaims the throne and Cleopatra Berenike's ambition is realised when he makes her joint monarch. Chickpea brings his mistress Irene and three children from Greece to be with him. He later decides to concentrate on fulfilling his role as chief priest of Egypt, leaving Berenike to run the kingdom. On his death, Irene returns to Greece, leaving the children in the safe care of Berenike. However, Chickpea's death leaves a dangerous power vacuum - and Rome is now taking a more than friendly interest. Rome installs Berenike's nephew Alexander II as the new King, much to her dismay; she refuses to consummate their marriage. Alexander accidentally kills her while attempting to rape her, and the mob kills him in turn. Chickpea's son Fluter, grandson of Cleopatra III, is made the new King.

=== 80 BC ===
Fluter and his sister Cleopatra V Tryphaena marry, while his younger brother Ptolemy is given Cyprus. Fluter recognises that Rome is the true source of all power and sets off on an extended royal visit, spending much money to bribe both Caesar and the Senate to recognise him as true king of Egypt. He neglects to include his brother Ptolemy of Cyprus in this arrangement; the Romans send an army to annex Cyprus, and Ptolemy, unwilling to become a client of Rome, sinks the royal treasury at sea and commits suicide. Fluter returns to Egypt but the people, and Cleopatra, blame him for the loss of Cyprus and the death of Ptolemy. Fluter returns to Rome to seek Roman armed support and the Egyptians, furious at this subservience, depose him in his absence and make his wife, Cleopatra Tryphaena (Cleopatra V Tryphaena), and his daughter, Berenike (Berenice IV), joint rulers. Cleopatra keeps sending delegations to Rome to press their case and Fluter keeps having them murdered.

Cleopatra Tryphaena dies leaving Berenike as sole ruler. She needs a husband to share the rule, the first candidate her advisers find is so repulsive she has him strangled. They then find her a young Greek general, Archelaus, who is much to her liking. But he is killed in battle, and Berenike refuses to flee and waits on the throne to confront her father, Fluter, who has her killed.

=== 51 BC ===
Fluter dies, leaving Cleopatra VII, now 18, as joint ruler with her young brother Ptolemy XIII. Cleopatra makes it clear her brother's regents can 'advise' him, but not her. Cleopatra, deceived by her brother's adviser Pothinus, receives and charms Pompey's son Gnaus, who has come to seek Egyptian support in for his father in his civil war against Caesar. This enrages the mob and Cleopatra has to flee, as Pothinus planned. The defeated Pompey is allowed to land by Ptolemy and his advisers; they then kill him, expecting to win the pursuing Caesar's approval. This does not work, Caesar is affronted by their treachery.

Caesar demands Ptolemy and Cleopatra's presence. Cleopatra, to get past Ptolemy's troops, has herself smuggled to Caesar in a carpet, and charms then seduces Caesar. Caesar restores Cleopatra to the throne jointly with Ptolemy, in accordance with their father's will, though neither one likes it.

Caesar instructs Ptolemy's general Achillas to disband his army; instead, Achillas goes to his army and marches on Alexandria. Cleopatra's sister Arsinoe goes to join Achillas. A deputation from the army arrives with the news that Arsinoe had Achillas killed. They ask for their king and Caesar, acting on Cleopatra's advice that he's a much worse tactician than Arsinoe, releases Ptolemy to them. Cleopatra foresees Ptolemy and Arsinoe's defeat.

=== 46 BC ===
Ptolemy XIII has been killed and Arsinoe captured. Cleopatra tells Caesar that she's pregnant with a son (Caesarion). Caesar invites Cleopatra to follow him to Rome. Caesar decides to publicly recognise Caesarion as his son and puts a statue of Cleopatra in the temple of Venus Genetrix.

Caesar discusses being made king with Mark Antony and Cleopatra. He tells Cleopatra he's going off to fight the Parthians, in his absence his friend Senna will propose a law allowing Caesar to have as many wives as he wishes, so he can marry Cleopatra and keep his wife Calpurnia.

But Caesar is assassinated. Apparently he never made a new will, Cleopatra is not mentioned. Cleopatra returns to Egypt with her younger brother Ptolemy XIV. She finds she's unpopular and there is a movement to depose her in favour of Ptolemy. However he promptly dies of a stomach upset. Cleopatra then reigns jointly with her infant son Caesarion (Ptolemy XV).

Cassius sends a request for Egyptian help against Antony; having exhausted all excuses, Cleopatra agrees, but her fleet dallies until Cassius has lost his battle. Mark Antony, having, with Octavian, defeated Brutus and Cassius, invites Cleopatra to see him at Tarsus. She ignores him but he persists; he has heard of her offered assistance to Cassius and wants an explanation. Cleopatra goes to Tarsus on a royal barge and seduces Mark Antony.

=== 35 BC ===
Cleopatra asks Mark Antony to kill her sister Arsinoe, who has been granted sanctuary as a priestess at Ephesus. Following a tiff, Cleopatra returns to Egypt. Antony follows, as she knew he would.

News arrives of Parthian incursions, and that Antony's brother and Antony's Roman wife Fulvia have taken up arms against Octavian. Antony sees this as his chance to unseat Octavian, but Cleopatra counsels caution. Antony goes to fight the Parthians, however he leaves his army in Syria and sails for Athens to meet Fulvia, but she dies of a fever.

Antony meets Octavian and they agree to divide the empire, Antony the east, Octavian the west. Octavian suggests, to seal the deal, that Antony marry Octavian's sister Octavia. Cleopatra is furious at the news.

Antony looks to continue his war against the Parthians, but needs money to finance it. He leaves Octavia in Athens, and invites Cleopatra to Antioch, where they resume their affair. He promises to acknowledge his two children with Cleopatra, Alexander Helios and Cleopatra Selene. In Alexandria, Antony publicly divides his empire among Caesarion, Alexander Helios and Cleopatra Selene, and his and Cleopatra's infant son Ptolemy Philadelphos.

He divorces Octavia. Octavian takes this as a personal insult and reacts savagely, despite Octavia (who still loves Antony) pleading with him for moderation. The Senate, at Octavian's behest, divests Mark Antony of his powers and declares war on Cleopatra.

Antony's friends begin to desert him. His and Cleopatra's forces are defeated by Octavian at the Battle of Actium and they quarrel. They decide not to flee but to stay in Alexandria to await the end. Cleopatra fears Antony will harm her in a drunken rage, she hides in her tomb and sends word she's dead. Antony stabs himself. Cleopatra has him brought to the tomb on a litter, where he dies.

Cleopatra receives Octavian in the throne room and begs him to spare her children, but he refuses. Cleopatra kills herself with an asp, as do her faithful maidservants, Charmian and Iras.

== Main cast ==
The Cleopatras
Cleopatra III and Cleopatra VII	Michelle Newell
Cleopatra II	Elizabeth Shepherd
Cleopatra Thea	Caroline Mortimer
Cleopatra Selene	Prue Clarke
Cleopatra IV	Sue Holderness
Cleopatra Berenike	Pauline Moran
Cleopatra Tryphaena, Queen of Syria	Amanda Boxer
Cleopatra Tryphaena, Queen of Egypt	Emily Richard
The Ptolemies
Potbelly	Richard Griffiths
Chickpea	David Horovitch
Ptolemy XIII	Daniel Beales
Fluter	Adam Bareham
Ptolemy XV	Lauren Beales
Eupator	Gary Carp
Ptolemy	Graham Seed
Memphites	Sadik Soussi
Alexander	Ian McNeice
Alexander the Younger	David Purcell
Berenike IV	Shelagh McLeod
Princess Arsinoe	Francesca Gonshaw
Theodotus	Graham Crowden

Romans
Julius Caesar	Robert Hardy
Mark Antony	Christopher Neame
Scipio Africanus	Geoffrey Whitehead
Lucius Licinius Lucullus	Donald Pickering
Gnaeus Pompey	Phillip Cade
Octavian	Rupert Frazer
Cicero	Manning Wilson
Cato	Godfrey James
Ahenobarbus	Matthew Long
Archelaus	Graham Pountney
Sextus	Patrick Troughton
Octavia	Karen Archer
The Seleucids
Demetrius	Stephen Greif
Grypus	James Aubrey
Seleucus	Nicholas Geake
Seleucus	Colin Higgins
Alexander Zebinas	Donald MacIver
Cyzicenus	Granville Saxton

== See also ==
- List of historical drama films
- History of Ptolemaic Egypt
- Ptolemaic dynasty
- Cultural depictions of Cleopatra VII
