= Early life of Cleopatra =

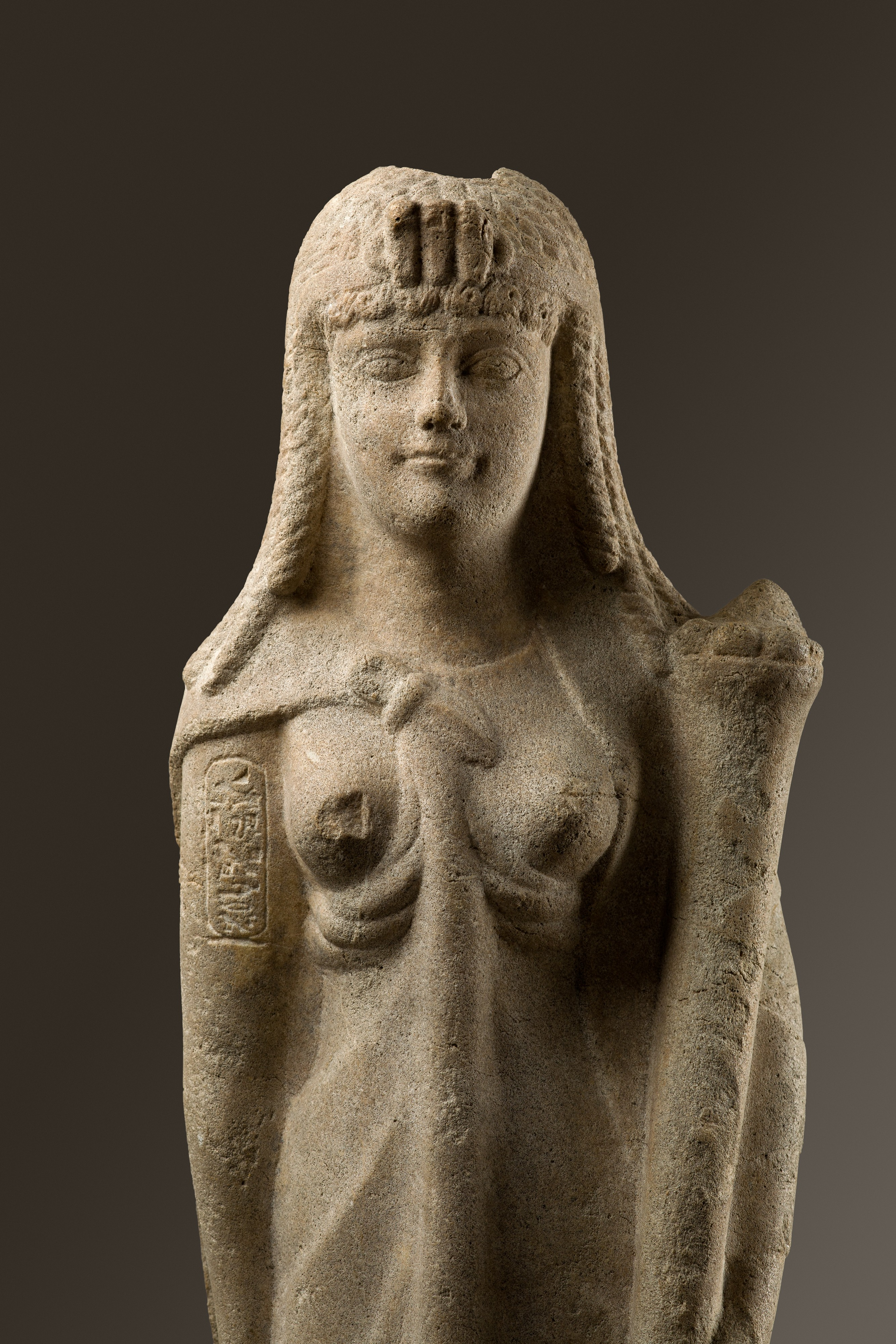
A contemporary marble statue of Cleopatra now at the Metropolitan Museum of Art, New York; she is identified by the cartouche inscribed on her upper right arm and the distinct triple uraeus on her diadem, a common characteristic of sculptural depictions of Cleopatra.

Cleopatra was born to the reigning pharaoh of Ptolemaic Egypt, Ptolemy XII Auletes; the identity of her mother is disputed and is presumed to have been Cleopatra V or Cleopatra VI, who may have been the same person. During her early childhood, Cleopatra was brought up in the palace of Alexandria in Egypt and received a primarily Hellenistic Greek education. By adulthood she was well-versed in many languages, including Egyptian, Ethiopian, Hebrew, Arabic, Median, Parthian, Latin, and her native Koine Greek.

Cleopatra's father was a client ruler of the Roman Republic. When the Romans annexed Cyprus and Ptolemy XII's brother Ptolemy of Cyprus chose to commit suicide rather than go into exile, Ptolemy XII became unpopular with the masses in Egypt for offering no public reaction to the events. He and a daughter, ostensibly Cleopatra and not Arsinoe IV, were exiled from Egypt during a revolt. This allowed Cleopatra's older sister Berenice IV to claim the throne in 58 BC, ruling jointly with Cleopatra VI. Ptolemy XII and Cleopatra traveled to Roman Italy, staying outside Rome at the villa of their Roman patron, Pompey the Great. After Ptolemy XII orchestrated the assassinations of Berenice IV's diplomats in Rome, seeking to gain Roman favor, he and Cleopatra left the city's hostile environment and settled at Ephesus in Anatolia.

Pompey eventually convinced Aulus Gabinius, the Roman governor of Syria, to invade Egypt and restore Ptolemy XII to power. In the spring of 55 BC, Gabinius' army invaded. One of his officers, Mark Antony, prevented Ptolemy XII from massacring the inhabitants of Pelousion for their defiance, and rescued the body of Berenice's husband, Archelaos, after he was killed in battle. Although Antony said years later that it was then that he fell in love with Cleopatra, they did not begin an affair until 41 BC. Ptolemy XII made Cleopatra his regent and joint ruler in 52 BC, naming her and his son Ptolemy XIII joint successors in his will. Ptolemy XII died by 22 March 51 BC, the date of Cleopatra's first known act as queen: restoring the sacred Buchis bull in Hermonthis, Egypt. She may have married her brother, Ptolemy XIII, but it is uncertain if they married before engaging in open hostilities against one another in the Alexandrine war.

== Birth and tutelage ==
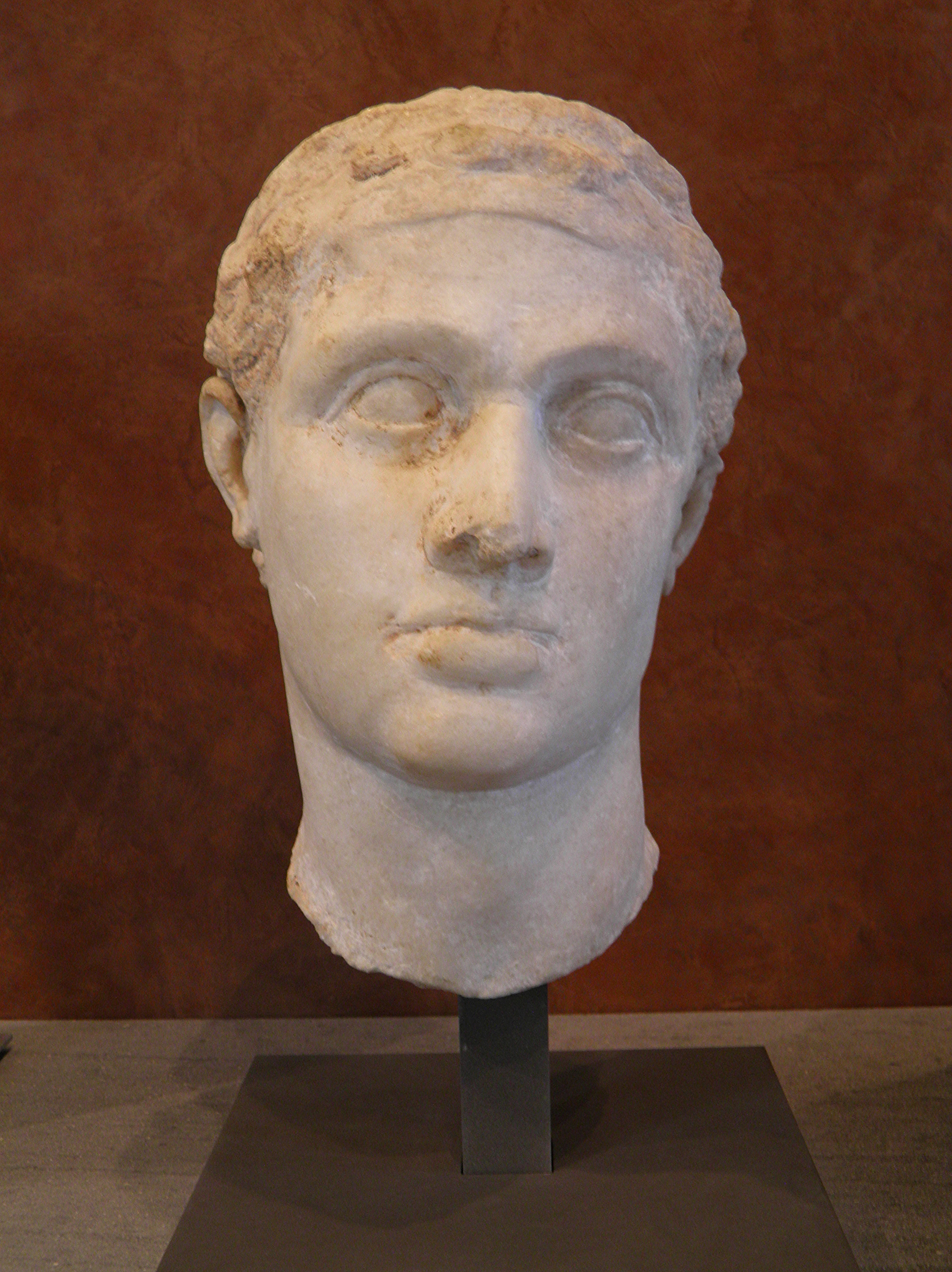
Marble bust of Ptolemy XII Auletes, the father of Cleopatra VII, in the Hellenistic Greek style, now in the Louvre. The features of the bust suggest it was reworked from an earlier Ptolemaic piece.

Cleopatra VII was born in early 69 BC to the Ptolemaic pharaoh Ptolemy XII Auletes and an uncertain mother, presumably Ptolemy XII's cousin or sister-wife Cleopatra V Tryphaena (Note: The historian Stanley M. Burstein raises the possibility that Cleopatra and some of her siblings were illegitimate children of Ptolemy XII, based on a statement made by the contemporary Greek geographer Strabo, who specifically noted that Berenice IV was legitimate. However, Strabo's reliability is questionable as he was biased against the Ptolemaic dynasty as a means to flatter the Romans; no other classical sources mention this.) Ptolemy XII was given the epithet "Auletes" ("the flute-player") due to his adoption of the title "New Dionysos" and his reported flute-playing during the Dionysian festivals. He had a reputation as an aloof monarch who enjoyed a life of luxury.

The classicist Michael Grant, the Egyptologist Joann Fletcher, and the historian Stanley M. Burstein label the wife of Ptolemy XII Auletes as Cleopatra V Tryphaena, while Aidan Dodson, Dyan Hilton, and Duane W. Roller call her Cleopatra VI Tryphaena, due to the confusion in primary sources conflating these two figures, who may have been one and the same. As explained by the scholar John Whitehorne, Cleopatra VI may have actually been a daughter of Ptolemy XII, who appeared in 58 BC to jointly-rule with her alleged sister Berenice IV (while Ptolemy XII was exiled and living in Rome), whereas Ptolemy XII's wife Cleopatra V perhaps died as early as the winter of 69–68 BC, when she disappears from historical records. Roller assumes that Ptolemy XII's wife, whom he numbers as Cleopatra VI, was merely absent from the court for a decade after being expelled for an unknown reason, eventually ruling jointly with her daughter Berenice IV. Fletcher explains that the Alexandrians deposed Ptolemy XII Auletes and installed "his eldest daughter, Berenike IV, and as co-ruler recalled Cleopatra V Tryphaena from 10 years' exile from the court. Although later historians assumed she must have been another of Auletes' daughters and numbered her "Cleopatra VI", it seems she was simply the fifth one returning to replace her brother and former husband Auletes." His three younger children (Cleopatra's sister Arsinoe IV and brothers Ptolemy XIII and Ptolemy XIV) were born during the more than decade-long absence of his wife.

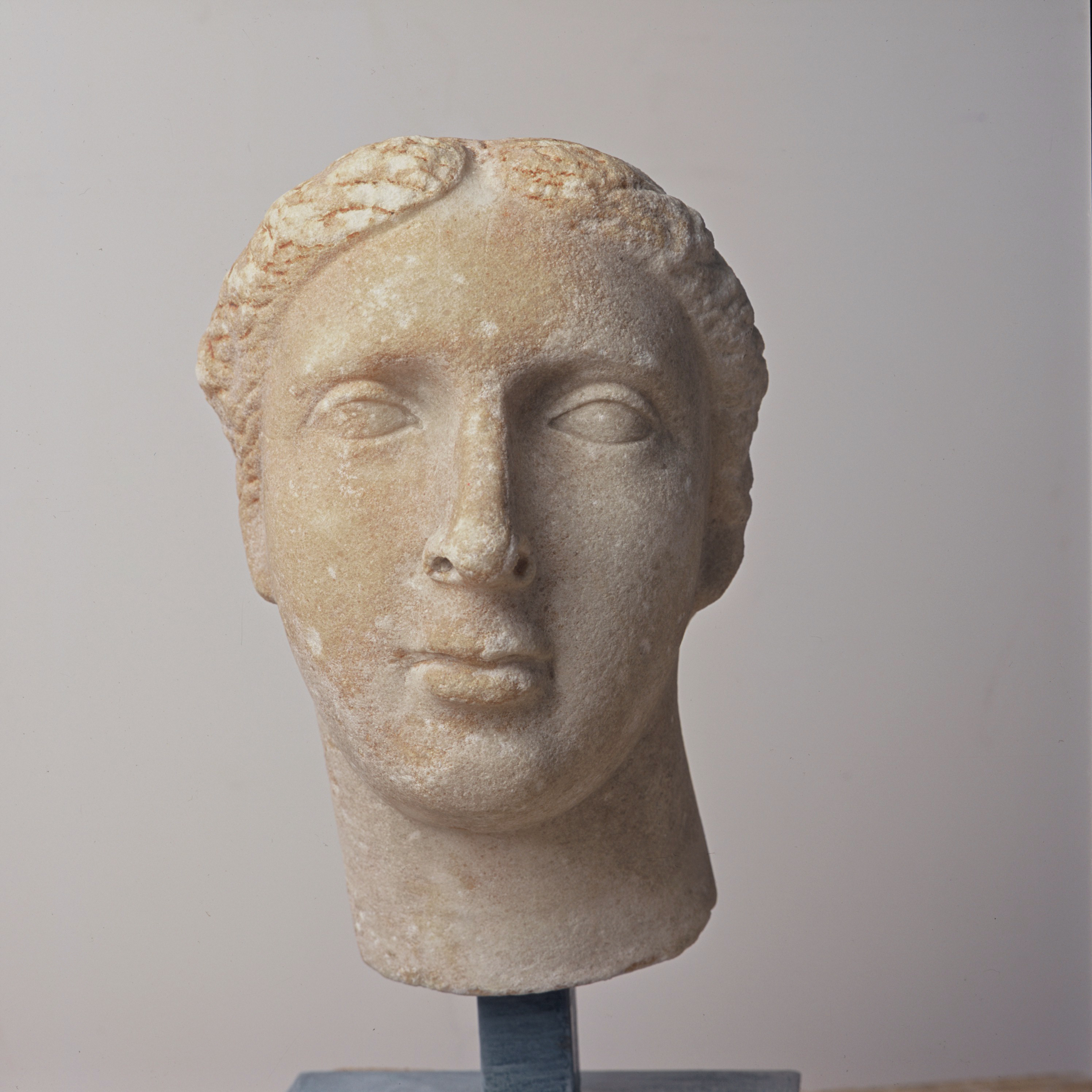
A likely sculpture of Cleopatra V Tryphaena (also known as Cleopatra VI), 1st century BC, from Lower Egypt, now in the Musée Saint-Raymond

Little is known of Cleopatra's early life. She likely received a good education, as was common among Ptolemaic royalty. Her childhood tutor was Philostratos, from whom she learned the Greek arts of oration and philosophy. During her youth Cleopatra presumably studied at the Musaeum (including the Library of Alexandria), and possibly wrote Greek medical works which may have been inspired by the physicians at her father's royal court. Later Arab historians claimed that Cleopatra wrote medical texts, but the long-held belief that Cleopatra was an author is, as Roller puts it, "obscure and full of problems... [and] Connecting these fragments to Cleopatra VII is, admittedly, difficult". Several works from antiquity, which now only exist as fragments, were labeled as Cleopatra's although Roller argues that "by late antiquity Cleopatra VII was by far the most famous person of that name and there would be a tendency to assume that the fragments were hers. Available to Cleopatra in historical records preserved by the 3rd-century BC Ptolemaic-era native Egyptian historian-priest Manetho were examples of strong, inspirational royal female predecessors (some of whom lived long before the Ptolemaic dynasty), such as Sobekneferu, Hatshepsut, Nefertiti, and Twosret.

Ptolemaic pharaohs were crowned by Egyptian priests of Ptah at Memphis but resided in the multicultural and largely-Greek city of Alexandria, founded by Alexander the Great of Macedon in 331 BC. They spoke Greek and governed Egypt as Hellenistic Greek monarchs, refusing to learn the native Egyptian language. Cleopatra could understand and speak many languages by adulthood, including Egyptian (being the first of her dynasty known to speak it), Ethiopian, Trogodyte, Hebrew (or Aramaic), Arabic, Syrian (perhaps Syriac), Median, Parthian, and Latin, although her Roman contemporaries would have preferred to speak with her in her native Koine Greek. Aside from Greek, Egyptian, and Latin, the three languages she had a known ability to read and write in, these languages reflected Cleopatra's expansionist territorial ambitions and her desire to regain African and Asian territories which had belonged to the Ptolemaic Empire.

Although Egyptians were the dominant ethnic group in Cleopatra's kingdom, large minorities of Greeks, Jews, Celtic and Germanic peoples, Syrians, Nubians, and others inhabited Egypt during her reign and well before it. Greeks and Jews were primarily concentrated in the multicultural cities of Alexandria, the old colony of Naukratis, and Ptolemais Hermiou (near Thebes in Upper Egypt). Greeks, Jews, and Egyptians in these cities were legally segregated and lived in different parts of the city. In Alexandria and other Greek city-states (poleis) of Egypt, intermarriage was forbidden, although it was permitted in other parts of Egypt.

== Reign of Ptolemy XII and Roman interventionism ==
Roman interventionism in Egypt predated the reign of Cleopatra VII; the Romans had long desired to annex the wealthy kingdom. In 168 BC, after the Seleucid ruler Antiochus IV invaded Ptolemaic Egypt, he obeyed the demands of the Roman Senate to withdraw and return to Seleucid territory instead of warring with the Roman Republic. When Ptolemy IX Lathyros died in late 81 BC, he was succeeded by his daughter Berenice III. With opposition building at the royal court against the idea of a sole female monarch, Berenice III accepted joint rule and marriage to Ptolemy XI Alexander II, the son of Ptolemy IX's brother Ptolemy X Alexander I. The match was arranged by the dictator Sulla, the first powerful Roman figure to intervene directly in the dynastic affairs of kingdoms east of the Roman Republic.

Ptolemy XI had his cousin-wife killed shortly after their marriage in 80 BC, but he was killed soon thereafter in the resulting riot over the assassination. Ptolemy XI (and perhaps his uncle Ptolemy IX or his father) willed the Ptolemaic Kingdom to Rome as collateral for loans, so the Romans had legal grounds to take over Egypt (their client state). They chose instead to carve up the Ptolemaic realm to be ruled by Ptolemy IX's two illegitimate sons, bestowing Cyprus to Ptolemy of Cyprus and Egypt to Ptolemy XII.

In 65 BC the Roman censor Marcus Licinius Crassus argued before the Roman Senate that Ptolemaic Egypt should be annexed (perhaps based on the previous will in exchange for loans), but his proposed bill was scuttled by Cicero's rhetoric. This was followed by another failed proposal for annexation by tribune Servilius Rullus in 63 BC. Ptolemy XII responded to the threatened Roman annexation of Egypt by offering lavish gifts to powerful Roman statesmen and military commanders, such as Pompey the Great (during his campaign against Mithridates VI of Pontus in the Third Mithridatic War) and Julius Caesar after the latter became consul in 59 BC.

After Crassus, Pompey, and Caesar formed the alliance of the First Triumvirate in 60 BC, they gave Ptolemy XII the title of "friend and ally of the Roman people" for his efforts in financing Pompey's eastern campaigns and Rome's conquests of West Asian territories which had belonged to the Seleucid Empire. The title cost 6,000 talents, nearly the entire annual tax revenue of Ptolemaic Egypt. Ptolemy XII's profligate behavior bankrupted him, and he was forced to acquire loans from Roman banker Gaius Rabirius Postumus. In order to repay the loans, Ptolemy was required to collect the equivalent amount of money, as well as added interest, from his subjects. His increase of the tax rate to pay for these expenditures angered the poor and led to strikes by farmers.

== Exile of Ptolemy XII and Cleopatra ==
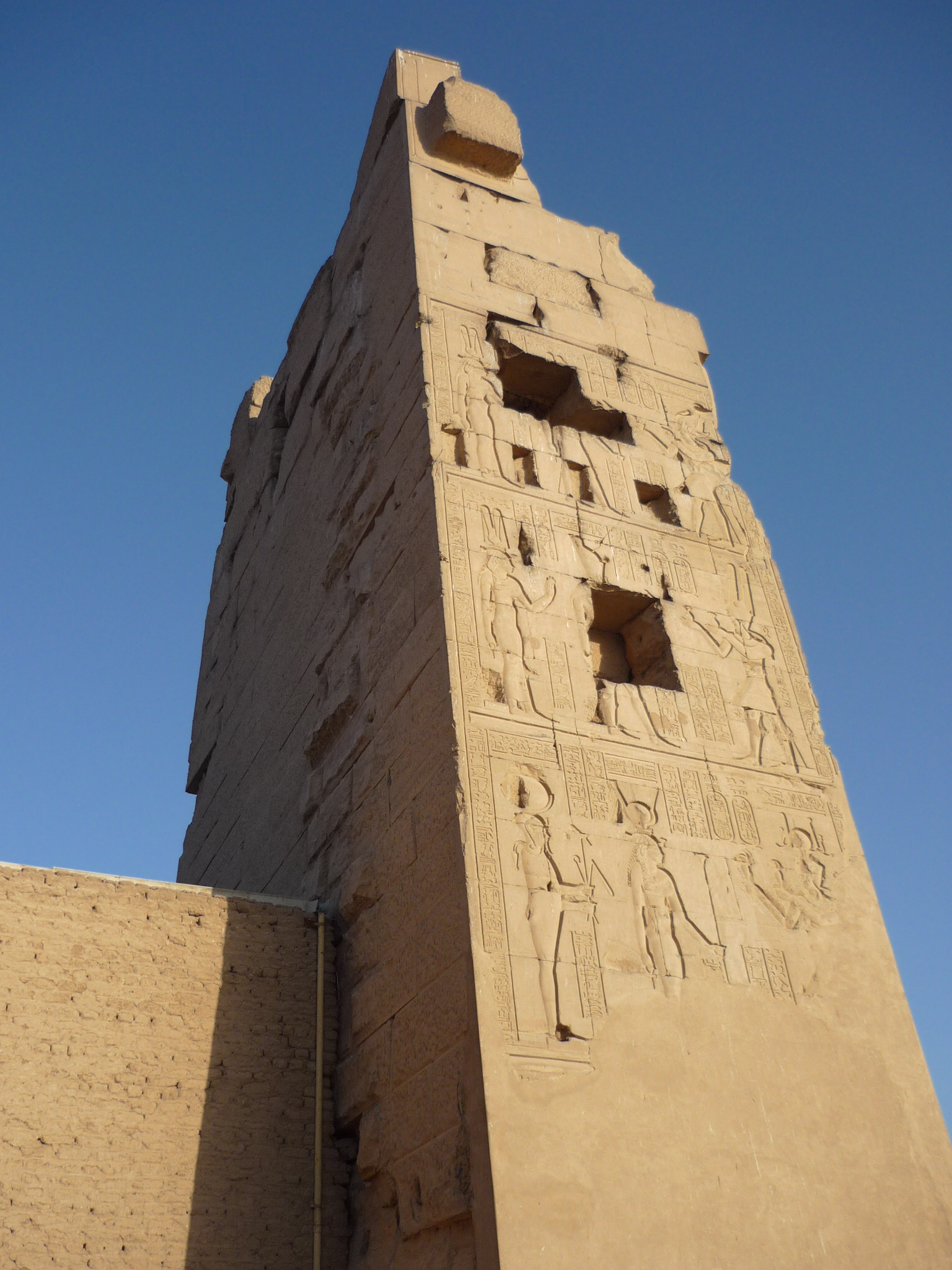
The Gate of Ptolemy XII at the Temple of Kom Ombo, partially built by Cleopatra's father

In 58 BC, after the Roman tribune Publius Clodius Pulcher accused Ptolemy of Cyprus of aiding pirates who disrupted Roman shipping, the Roman Republic annexed Cyprus, and Ptolemy of Cyprus chose to commit suicide rather than face exile to Paphos as a priest of Apollo. Ptolemy XII remained publicly silent on the death of his brother, a decision which (along with ceding traditional Ptolemaic territory to the Romans) damaged his credibility among subjects already enraged by his economic policies.

Whether by force or voluntary action, Ptolemy XII left Egypt in exile for Rhodes. There he held an audience with the Roman statesman Cato the Younger, who castigated him for losing his kingdom. Ptolemy XII then traveled to Athens, where he erected a monument in honor of his father and half-sister Berenice III, and finally to the triumvir Pompey's villa in the Alban Hills near Praeneste. Ptolemy XII spent nearly a year on the outskirts of Rome, ostensibly accompanied by his 11-year-old daughter Cleopatra.

Fletcher expresses little doubt about this, noting an ancient Greek primary source stating that Ptolemy XII traveled with one of his daughters; since Berenice IV was his ruling rival and Arsinoe IV was a toddler, it must have been Cleopatra (who was later made his regent and named his successor in his will). Grant likewise argues in favor of this notion, stating that Ptolemy XII would have found it imprudent to leave all of his daughters in Egypt, given the political turmoil.

Events in Egypt are unclear around this time. It is thought that Ptolemy XII's daughter Berenice IV initially ruled jointly with Cleopatra VI Tryphaena. Cleopatra VI is then believed to have died, possibly subsequent to being ousted by Berenice. Berenice IV sent an emissary to Rome to advocate for her rule and oppose the reinstatement of her father Ptolemy XII, but Ptolemy used his assassins to kill the emissary (an incident covered up by his powerful Roman supporters). When Caesar failed to secure a popular election as Governor-General of Egypt, he settled for a five-year command of Gaul and allowed his rival Pompey to settle the matter of the Egyptian throne. The Roman Senate denied Ptolemy XII the offer of an armed escort and provisions for a return to Egypt, so he decided to leave Rome in late 57 BC for the Temple of Artemis at Ephesus.

== Return to Egypt from exile ==
To shore up her legitimacy with her subjects, Berenice IV married Archelaos (reportedly a descendant of Mithridates VI of Pontus); however, the Romans— especially desperate financiers of Ptolemy XII such as Rabirius Postumus—were determined to restore Ptolemy XII. Pompey persuaded Aulus Gabinius, the Roman governor of Syria, to invade Egypt and restore Ptolemy XII, offering him 10,000 talents for the mission. Although it put him at odds with Roman law, Gabinius invaded Egypt in the spring of 55 BC by way of Hasmonean Judea; Hyrcanus II had Antipater the Idumaean, the father of Herod the Great, furnish the Roman-led army with supplies.

Under Gabinius' command was the young cavalry officer Mark Antony, who distinguished himself by preventing Ptolemy XII from massacring the inhabitants of Pelousion and rescuing the body of Archelaos after the latter was killed in another battle, ensuring him a royal burial. The 14-year-old Cleopatra would have accompanied the Roman expedition into Egypt. Years later, Mark Antony said that he had fallen in love with her at this time. Their affair only began 41 BC, when the triumvir Antony summoned Cleopatra to his headquarters at Tarsos to answer for her alleged support of Gaius Cassius Longinus in the Liberators' civil war of 43–42 BC.

Gabinius was tried in Rome for abusing his authority and acquitted. A second trial found him guilty of accepting bribes and led to a seven-year exile, from which he was recalled in 48 BC by Julius Caesar. Crassus replaced him as governor of Syria, extending his provincial command to Egypt until he was killed by the Parthians in the 53 BC Battle of Carrhae. Ptolemy XII had Berenice and her wealthy supporters executed and seized their property. The Gabiniani, Gabinius' largely-Germanic and Gallic Roman garrison, were allowed to harass people in the streets of Alexandria. Ptolemy XII installed his longtime Roman financier, Rabirius Postumus, as his chief financial officer. Postumus was unable to collect all of Ptolemy XII's debt by the latter's death and it was passed on to his successors, Cleopatra VII and Ptolemy XIII. Within a year, Postumus was placed under protective custody and sent back to Rome when his life was threatened for draining Egypt of its resources.

During the last four years of his reign, Ptolemy XII oversaw major construction projects such as the completion of the Temple of Edfu and establishment of the Dendera Temple, and stabilized an economy largely reliant on trade with East Africa and India. He also designated Cleopatra VII and Ptolemy XIII as his joint heirs. A copy of his will was sent to Pompey to be kept in Rome, with the original being held in Alexandria. According to an inscription in the Temple of Hathor at Dendera, Cleopatra was made a regent of Ptolemy XII on 31 May 52 BC.

== Accession to the throne ==
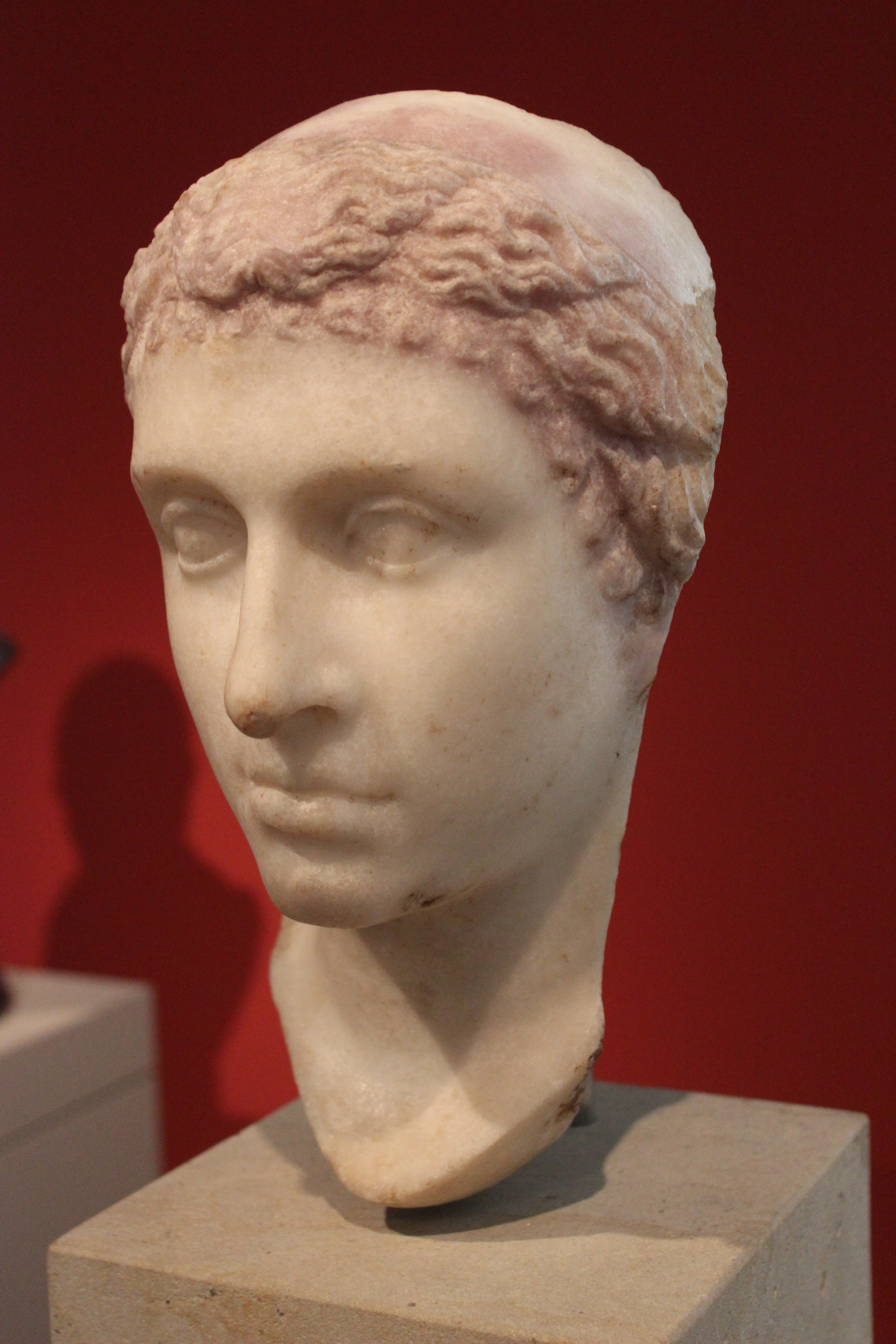
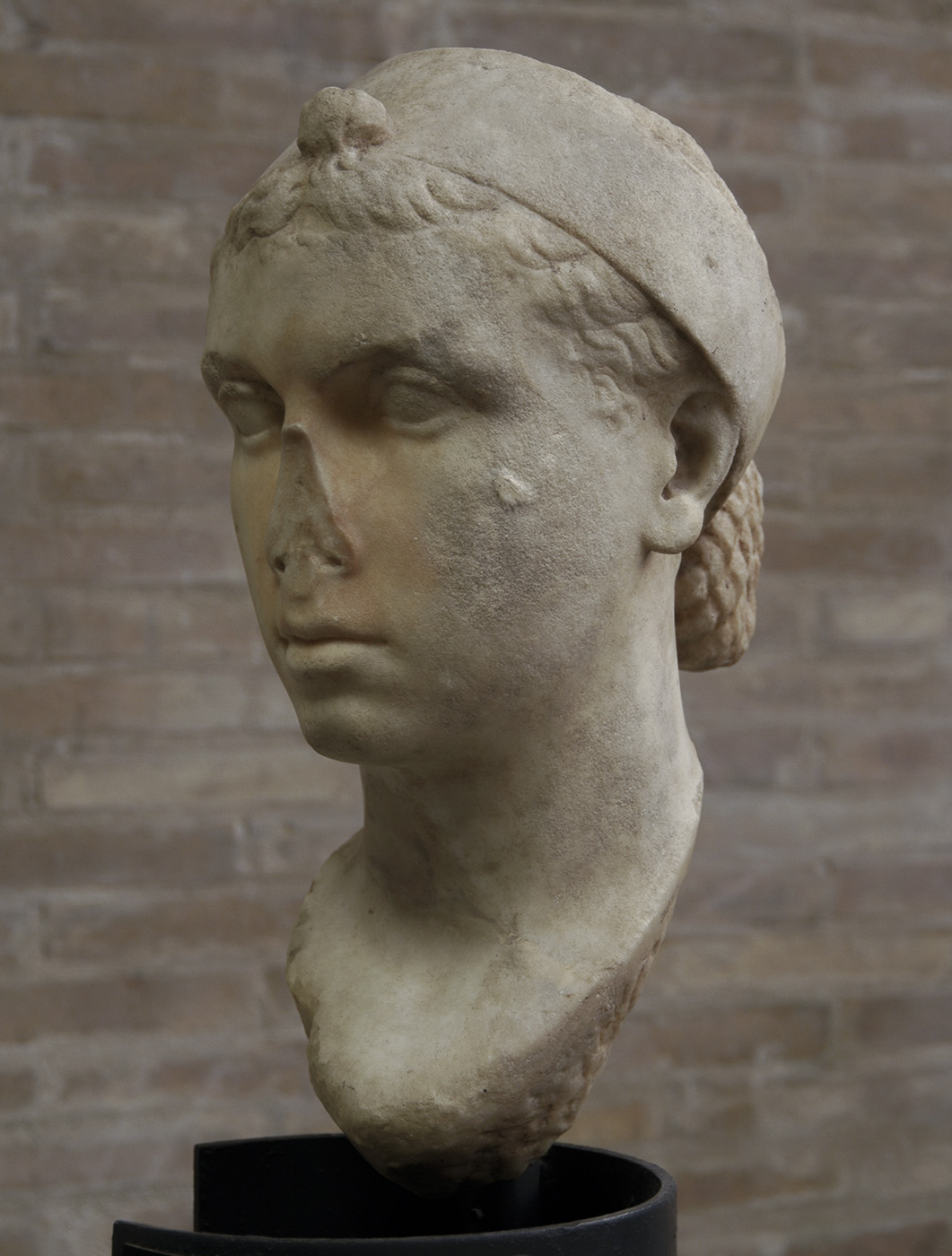
(left) Cleopatra VII bust in the Altes Museum, Antikensammlung Berlin, Roman artwork, mid-1st century BC; (right) Bust of Cleopatra VII, dated 40–30 BC, Vatican Museums, showing her with a "melon" hairstyle and Hellenistic royal diadem

Ptolemy XII died sometime before 22 March 51 BC, the date of Cleopatra's first known act as queen: her voyage to Hermonthis, near Thebes, to install a new sacred Buchis bull, worshiped as an intermediary for the god Montu in ancient Egyptian religion. The Roman Senate was not informed about Ptolemy's death until 30 June or 1 August 51 BC. The news may have been suppressed by Cleopatra until she could secure the throne. Cleopatra probably married her twelve-year-old brother, Ptolemy XIII, but whether the marriage actually occurred is uncertain. The native Egyptian priesthood received a number of privileges and became extremely wealthy under their Ptolemaic patrons, often becoming targets of native Egyptian revolts. Cleopatra is speculated to have had an Egyptian half-cousin, Pasherienptah III, the High Priest of Ptah at Memphis. At the beginning of her reign Cleopatra sought the support and loyalty of the Egyptian priesthood, despite attempts by Ptolemy XIII to undermine this relationship.

The incestuous Ptolemaic practice of sibling marriage was introduced by Ptolemy II and his sister, Arsinoe II, but the long-held royal Egyptian practice was considered scandalous by contemporary Greeks. Although vocal critics of this incestuous practice were sometimes violently punished and suppressed during the joint reign of Ptolemy II and Arsinoe II, (Note: The German archaeologist Michael Pfrommer wrote the following about the sibling marriage of Ptolemy II and Arsinoe II: "Ptolemy Keraunos, who wanted to become king of Macedon...killed Arsinoë's small children in front of her. Now queen without a kingdom, Arsinoë fled to Egypt, where she was welcomed by her full brother Ptolemy II. Not content, however, to spend the rest of her life as a guest at the Ptolemaic court, she had Ptolemy II's wife exiled to Upper Egypt and married him herself around 275 B.C. Though such an incestuous marriage was considered scandalous by the Greeks, it was allowed by Egyptian custom. For that reason the marriage split public opinion into two factions. The loyal side celebrated the couple as a return of the divine marriage of Zeus and Hera, whereas the other side did not refrain from profuse and obscene criticism. One of the most sarcastic commentators, a poet with a very sharp pen, had to flee Alexandria. The unfortunate poet was caught off the shore of Crete by the Ptolemaic navy, put in an iron basket, and drowned. This and similar actions seemingly slowed down vicious criticism.") sibling marriages were nevertheless considered a normal arrangement for Ptolemaic rulers by the time of Cleopatra's reign. Official documents began listing Cleopatra as sole ruler by 29 August 51 BC, evidence that she had rejected her brother as a co-ruler.

== See also ==
- Reign of Cleopatra
- Death of Cleopatra
- Amanirenas (contemporary queen of Kush who fought a war against the Romans in Egypt and Nubia)
- List of cultural depictions of Cleopatra
- Cleopatra race controversy
