= Antiochus XIII Asiaticus =

Seleucid King of Syria from 82 to 64 BC

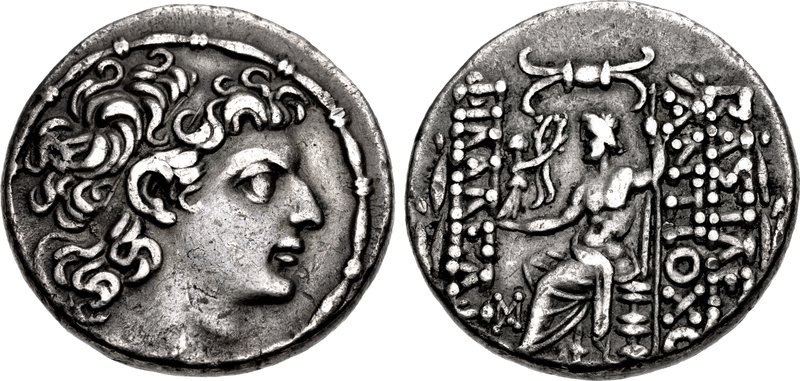
- Tetradrachm of Antiochos XIII, with Zeus Nikephoros on the reverse, minted at Antioch.

King of Syria
- Reign: 82–64 BC
- Predecessor: Philip I
- Successor: Philip II
- Co-ruler and regent: Cleopatra Selene (82–69 BC)
- Born: Unknown
- Died: 64 BC
Regnal name
- Antiochus Philadelphus
- Dynasty: Seleucid
- Father: Antiochus X Eusebes
- Mother: Cleopatra Selene of Syria

Antiochus XIII Philadelphus, (Greek: Ἀντίοχος ΙΓ' Φιλάδελφος) known as Asiaticus, (Ἀσιατικός) was the penultimate ruler of the Seleucid kingdom.

== Biography ==
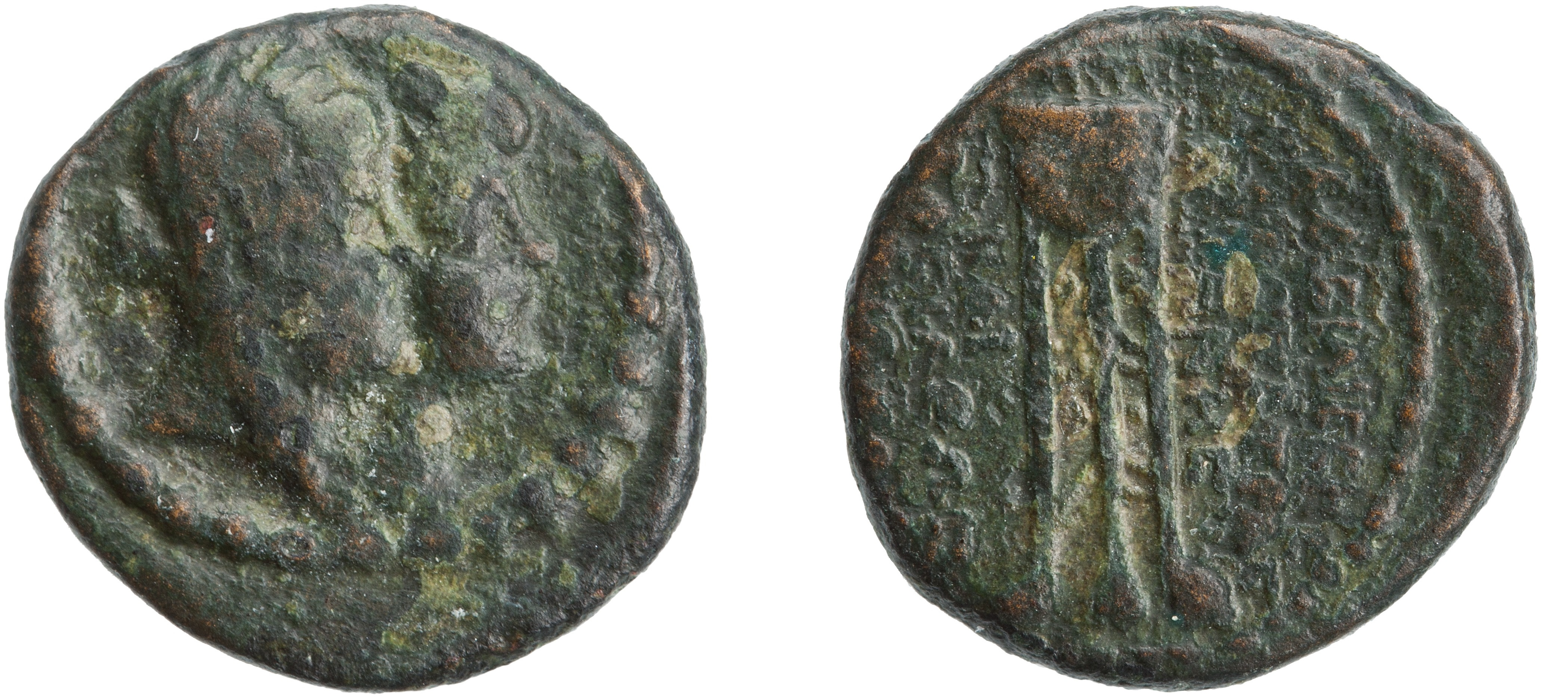
Coin of Cleopatra Selene (front) and Antiochus XIII

Antiochus took the throne after the death of his father, king Antiochus X Eusebes, sometime between 92 and 88 BC. The new king was underage, and his mother, the Ptolemaic princess Cleopatra Selene of Syria, acted as his regent. Some time after Tigranes had conquered Syria (83 or 74 BC), Antiochus and his brother traveled to Rome to have recognized as kings of Egypt, but to no avail. However, between 75 BC and 73 BC, they were recognized as "Kings of Syria", and "maintained a royal state". Selene was eventually captured and killed by Tigranes. However, after the latter's defeat by Lucius Licinius Lucullus at the Battle of Tigranocerta, the residents of Antioch hailed Antiochus XIII as king, and Lucullus approved his appointment as client ruler of Syria (69 BC).

In 64 BC, Pompey had Antiochus XIII deposed and killed by a Syrian chieftain, Sampsiceramus I. Antiochus' death is traditionally said to have ended the Seleucid dynasty, but he was survived by Philip II Philoromaeus for a short time and by Seleucus VII Philometor until 58 BC, if the latter is identified with same prince who briefly married Berenice IV of Egypt.

== See also ==
- List of Syrian monarchs
- Timeline of Syrian history

== Notes ==
Antiochus XIII Asiaticus Seleucid dynasty Born: Unknown Died: 64 BC
Regnal titles
Preceded by Tigranes, Cleopatra Selene of Syria, Seleucus VII Philometer	Seleucid King (King of Syria); 83 BC–64 BC with Cleopatra Selene of Syria (83 BC–69 BC)	Succeeded by Philip II Philoromaeus
