= Joint monarchy =

Joint monarchy may refer to:

- Coregency, two monarchs in one state
- Personal union, one monarch in two states
- Condominium (international law), two states sharing sovereignty over one territory
