= David Purcell =

British stage and screen actor (born 1948)

- Born: David Lawrence Purcell; 28 August 1948 (age 77); Barton on Sea, Hampshire, England
- Occupation(s): Actor, judge, solicitor
- Spouse: Diana Elmore (m. 1989, separated)
- Children: 1
- Relatives: Andrew Purcell (brother)

David Lawrence Purcell (born 28 August 1948) is an English stage and screen actor, retired criminal defence solicitor and judge. He is known for roles in BBC dramas such as The Cleopatras, Bergerac and Doctor Who.

== Acting ==
David Purcell, the son of actors Roy Purcell and Myrtle Moss, was born 28 August 1948 in Hampshire. After leaving school, he had cricket trials with the county before deciding to work in the theatre. Following working as an Assistant Stage Manager in weekly repertory, his acting career began in repertory at Sidmouth and Eastbourne followed by seasons at the Byre Theatre in St Andrews. Purcell spent a year working in children's theatre, touring the country with plays for schoolchildren followed by more repertory work before entering television. In 1968 he portrayed Mate in Tony Parkin's Life is a Cell at the Little Theatre Club on St Martin's Lane; a prison cell drama for two male characters. In 1969 he appeared in Agatha Christie's Towards Zero at the New Wimbledon Theatre.

In 1971 Purcell played roles at the Everyman Theatre, Cheltenham; including Curé Maximin in Trap for a Lonely Man, Major Guy Ashley in Who Goes There!, and Police Constable Noah Topping in Dandy Dick. In 1974 he played a minor role in Mercury Theatre, Colchester's (MTC) production of She Stoops to Conquer. He portrayed Mr Dorilant in William Wycherley's The Country Wife at the MTC in 1975. In 1976 he starred in a production of Alfie at the Theatre Royal, Newcastle, and performed the part of the Sergeant Major in King and Country at the Mermaid Theatre. In the 1970s he portrayed Detective Sergeant Trotter in the long-running West End production of Christie's The Mousetrap at the St Martin's Theatre.

In 1980 Purcell played the lead male role of the Taxi Driver in the Court Theatre Company's (CTC) production of Snakes and Ladders at the Finborough Theatre (FT). In February 1981 he returned to the FT in the title role of the CTC production of Marvin Cohen's The Don Juan. The Guardian's critic stated, "The story counterpoints and his obverse, a puling Woody Allen clone desperately botching his fumbles. Beefy David Purcell is better at this than at the raunchy alter ego, who like other Don Juans, is boring when clothed." In September 1981 he appeared in the CTC's production of William Shakespeare's The Taming of the Shrew at the Intimate Theatre. Other CTC productions he performed in included A Bed of Roses (1980, FT), Behind a Painted Smile (1980, FT), and Joe (1980, FT). He directed the CTC's 1980 productions of Bryan Oliver's The Boxer and Rodney Hyde-Thompson's The Alternative at the FT.

Purcell was a main cast member in the 1983 BBC Television historical drama serial The Cleopatras; portraying Alexander the Younger. His other television credits include appearances in Z-Cars, The Brothers, Doctor Who and The New Avengers.

== Law ==
Retraining as a solicitor in his mid-thirties, Purcell became a criminal defence advocate, setting up an office called David Purcell & Co Solicitors at Caledonian House in Feltham, Middlesex. Over time, his cases have involved protecting victims of domestic violence, drink driving (one incident defending actor Charles Morgan), computer fraud, drinking while disqualified, assault, stealing, arson, murder and smuggling. He penned a book of his career entitled Duty Brief: A Week in My Working Life, detailing the clients he represented in his career and what became of them, published in 2023.

Purcell has also served as a deputy district judge, appointed in 2000. Upon moving to West Cumbria in light of the Derrick Bird shootings, he has sentenced people for committing crimes such as malpractice and animal cruelty.

Now retired from the law, Purcell has gone back to his acting roots, appearing in short films and commercials.

== Selected filmography ==
=== Film ===
Year	Title	Role	Notes
1974	Juggernaut	1st Detective	
1975	Conduct Unbecoming	2nd Lt. Boulton	
1983	Loose Connections	Photographer	

=== Television ===
Year	Title	Role	Notes
1971	Z-Cars	Brian	Episode: "Kid's Stuff"
1973	Warship	Chief - Second CPO	Episode: "The Drop"
1975	Barlow at Large	Inspector	Episode: "Bullion"
1975	The Brothers	Lorry Driver	Episode: "Special Licence"
1975	Edward the Seventh	Police Constable	Episode: "The Royal Quadrille"
1976	Doctor Who	Abbott	Episode: "The Hand of Fear: Part One"
1976	The New Avengers	Orderly	Episode: "Dirtier by the Dozen"
1978	Backs to the Land	Corporal	Episode: "Waits and Desperate Measures"
1980	Holding the Fort	Police Constable	Episode: "Twelve Good Men and Pooh"
1983	The Cleopatras	Alexander the Younger	main cast member
1983	Bergerac	Special Branch Man	Episode: "A Miracle Every Week"
1983	Play for Today	Beggar	Episode: "The Falklands Factor"
1983	Dramarama	Tully	Episode: "Mighty Mum and the Petnappers"
