= Seleucus VII Philometor =

Possible Seleucid King of Syria

- Seleucus VII Kybiosaktes

King of the Seleucid Empire
- Reign: 83–69 BC (in opposition to Tigranes II of Armenia)
- Predecessor: Philip I Philadelphus
- Successor: Antiochus XIII Asiaticus
- Co-rulers: Cleopatra Selene (mother) and possibly Antiochus XIII Asiaticus (younger brother)

Egyptian royal consort (possibly co-regent)
- Tenure: Circa 57 BC
- Successor: Archelaus I of Comana
- Born: Unknown
- Died: Circa 57 BC (exact date unknown); Likely Egypt
- Spouse: Berenice IV (possibly)
- Dynasty: Seleucid
- Father: Antiochus X Eusebes
- Mother: Cleopatra Selene

Seleucus VII Philometor (Ancient Greek: Φιλομήτωρ) or Kybiosactes (Ancient Greek: Κυβιοσάκτης), was a possible ruler of the Seleucid kingdom based in Syria, but his existence is disputed.

== Biography ==
=== King of Syria ===
The identities of the last members of the Seleucid dynasty are difficult to ascertain: many of them bore the same names. Seleucus was unknown until recently. From coins issued by him and his mother, Ptolemaic princess Cleopatra Selene, it is presumed that he was her son by king Antiochus X Eusebes, and a brother of later king Antiochus XIII Asiaticus. He appears to have "reigned" during the occupation of Syria by Armenian king Tigranes (83-69 BC). In reality, only a few cities were loyal to the Seleucids during this period.

Some time after Tigranes had conquered Syria (83 BC), his mother travelled to Rome to have her sons recognized as kings of Egypt, but to no avail. They were there between at least 75 BC and 73 BC; recognized as "Kings of Syria", and "maintained a royal state".

=== Co-regent of Egypt ===
The young boy-king is probably the same Seleucus who later went to marry a Ptolemaic princess called Berenice IV on an unknown date (a sister of the famous Cleopatra VII of Egypt) to become co-regent of Egypt, but allegedly was murdered by the discontented bride for his lack of manners. He bore the derogatory name Kybiosaktes, the term for the foul-smelling work of cutting tuna fish.

== Controversy ==
In 2002, the numismatist Brian Kritt announced the discovery and decipherment of a coin bearing the portrait of Cleopatra Selene and a co-ruler. Kritt read the name of the ruler as Seleucus Philometor and, based on the epithet, identified him with Cleopatra Selene's son, unnamed by Cicero. Kritt gave the newly discovered ruler the regnal name Seleucus VII, and considered it very likely that he is identical with Kybiosaktes. But Hoover rejected Kritt's reading, noting that the coin was badly damaged and some letters were unreadable. Hoover read the king's name as Antiochus and identified him with Antiochus XIII.

== See also ==
- List of Syrian monarchs
- Timeline of Syrian history

== Sources ==
- Heinen, Heinz (1968). "Séleucos Cybiosactés et le Probléme De Son Identité". In Cerfaux, Lucien; et al. (eds.). Antidorum W. Peremans Sexagenario Ab Alumnis Oblatum. Studia Hellenistica (in French). Vol. 16. Publications universitaire de Louvain. OCLC 876029154.

Seleucus VII Philometor Seleucid dynasty Born: Unknown Died: Unknown
Regnal titles
Preceded by Tigranes	Seleucid King (King of Syria); 83 BC–69 BC with Cleopatra Selene I (83 BC–69 BC)	Succeeded by Antiochus XIII Asiaticus
