= Coregency =

Situation in a single-person monarchy in which two or more people hold the title

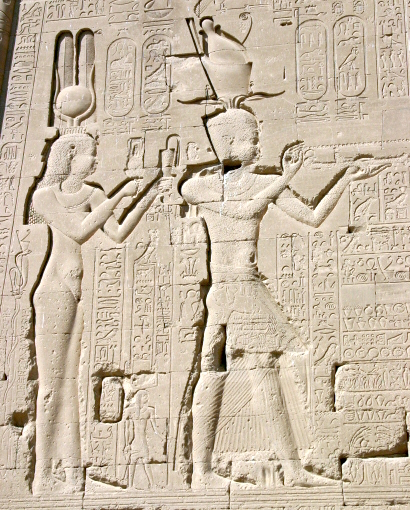
Pharaoh Cleopatra VII and her eldest son and co-regent Ptolemy XV, carving on temple at Dendera

A coregency is the situation where a monarchical position (such as prince, princess, king, queen, emperor or empress), normally held by only a single person, is held by two or more. It is distinct from diarchies or duumvirates (such as Andorra, ancient Sparta and Rome), where monarchical power is permanently divided between two rulers; and also from regencies, where a person, who is not legally monarch themselves, exercises monarchical power on the behalf of reigning monarch who is absent or unable to rule (for example due to illness or young age).

== Historical examples ==
Coregencies were common in the Hellenistic period; according to one scholar, they "can usually be explained as a means of avoiding crises of succession or internal conflict, and of strengthening dynastic identity and ideology." Other examples include the coregency of Frederick I of Austria and Louis the Bavarian over the Kingdom of Germany. Jure uxoris kings in kingdoms such as Portugal and Spain are also found (Ferdinand V and Isabella I of Castile, Philip I and Joanna of Castile, Peter III and Maria I of Portugal, etc.). In Navarre, the husbands of queens regnant were styled as co-rulers.

=== Ancient Egypt ===
In Ancient Egypt, coregency was quite problematic as the Pharaoh was seen as the incarnation/representation of the god Horus. Therefore, according to the divine order Ma'at, only one King could exist at the same time. Yet, exceptions can be found, mainly in the Middle Kingdom, where the pharaoh occasionally appointed his successor (often one of his sons) as coregent, or joint king, to ensure a smooth succession. “This system was used, from at least as early as the Middle Kingdom, in order to ensure that the transfer of power took place with the minimum of disruption and instability”. Coregencies are highly probable for Amenemhat I > Senusret I > Amenemhat II > Senusret II. Most probably the real king in power was the older one (father) adopting the younger ruler (son), while the co-regent had to wait until after the death of the older one to really have access to full royal power. Yet, the years of reigns normally were counted from the beginning of the coregency on. Due to this and to the fragmentary character of known sources, the establishment of Egyptian chronology was quite complicated and remains disputed up to date. Yet, understanding the existence of co-regency reduced the chaos quite a lot.

The institution of coregency is different from that of regency, where an adult person (in Ancient Egypt often the mother of the king) functions as ruler in the name of the underage monarch. Some of the female regents of Egypt rose to a status of equal to the God-Kings, becoming co-rulers as can be seen in the famous case of Hatshepsut. After the death of her husband Thutmose II, Hatshepsut ruled in the name of Thutmose III, her nephew and stepson. Then, latest in year 7 of Thutmose III's reign, she took over royal regalia and was then titled King of Egypt under the Throne name (prenomen) Maatkare. For later periods of Pharaonic Egyptian history, the existence of the institution of coregency has been put into question by Egyptologists, while, "the Ptolemaic and Roman period examples being the most securely identified".

In Hellenized Egypt during the Ptolemaic period, Arsinoe II was given the title of nswt-bjtj, which is usually translated as "King of Upper and Lower Egypt". Later royal wives like Berenice II, Arsinoe III and Cleopatra I Syra were given the feminine form of the pharaonic titulary of their husbands, including "female Horus", "female pharaoh" and "female ruler", which is sometimes interpreted as a sign of coregency with their spouses. However, neither of them appear as formal co-ruler in official protocols mentioning their husbands's regnal years.

Official coregency between two royal spouses, when both were named as co-rulers in Hellenistic administration of the country, was for the first time introduced when Cleopatra II was named as co-ruler alongside her brothers: Ptolemy VI (her husband) and Ptolemy VIII Physcon. After their reign, coregency continued in various forms, like simultaneous rule of siblings, spouses or parent and child, and it seems that from ideological point of view king was unable to rule without queen as his co-ruler, and likewise.

Nominal co-rule during Ptolemaic period was documented between:

- Ptolemy I Soter and Ptolemy II
- Ptolemy VI, Cleopatra II and Ptolemy VIII Physcon
- Ptolemy VIII Physcon, Cleopatra II and Cleopatra III
- Cleopatra II, Cleopatra III and Ptolemy IX Lathyros
- Cleopatra III and Ptolemy X
- Ptolemy X and Berenice III
- Ptolemy IX Lathyros and Berenice III
- Berenice III and Ptolemy XI
- Ptolemy XII Auletes and Cleopatra V Tryphaena
- Cleopatra VI Tryphaena and Berenice IV
- Cleopatra VII consecutively with Ptolemy XIII, Ptolemy XIV and Ptolemy XV Caesarion

=== Ancient Israel ===
In the book The Mysterious Numbers of the Hebrew Kings, Edwin R. Thiele proposed co-regency as a possible explanation for discrepancies in the dates given in the Hebrew Bible for the reigns of the kings of Israel and Judah. At least one co-regency is explicitly documented in the Bible: the coronation of King Solomon occurred before the death of his father David.

=== Britain ===
King Henry II of England installed his eldest surviving son, also named Henry, as junior king. Henry the Young King was not permitted to exercise royal authority and his title as co-king was effectively a sinecure to denote his status as his father's chosen heir. Young Henry predeceased his father without ever ascending to the throne and is not included in the official list of English monarchs.

The Monarchy of England experienced joint rule under the terms of the act sanctioning the marriage of Mary I to Philip II of Spain. Philip notionally reigned as king of England (inclusive of Wales) and Ireland by right of his wife from 1554 to 1558. Similarly, following the Glorious Revolution, Mary II and her husband William III held joint sovereignty over the kingdoms of England, Scotland, and Ireland from 1688 to 1694.

=== France ===
Following the extinction of the Carolingian dynasty in West Francia, the Western Frankish nobles elected Hugh Capet as their new king. Upon his ascension Hugh secured the election of his only son Robert as his co-king. As such, when Hugh died it did not trigger an election for a new king, nor did Robert necessarily "inherit" the crown, but simply continued his kingship. Subsequent Capetian kings would also name their eldest son or brother as co-ruler, until the tradition of agnatic primogeniture was sufficiently established to transform the King of France from an elected monarch to a hereditary one.

=== Lithuania ===
Several Grand Dukes of Lithuania shared power with close relatives.

It is believed that Kęstutis was co-ruler alongside his brother Algirdas and then Algirdas's son, Jogaila, before turning against him in 1382. The civil war between uncle and nephew ended with the former's death. After period of sole rule, Jogaila - being mostly absent from Lithuania after he had ascended the throne of Poland - decided to name Kęstutis's son Vytautas as the Grand Duke in 1401, while remaining de iure dominant co-ruler as the Supreme Duke.

Following Vytautas's death, other coregencies between Supreme Duke and his submonarch followed:

- Švitrigaila (Grand Duke) and Jogaila (Supreme Duke) for a brief period, until Švitrigaila declared war on Poland.
- Sigismund Kęstutaitis (Grand Duke) and Jogaila (Supreme Duke) until Jogaila's death.
- Sigismund Kęstutaitis (Grand Duke) and Władysław Jagiellon (Supreme Duke), until Sigismund's death.
- Casimir Jagiellon was named by Władysław Jagiellon as his regent in Lithuania, however Lithuanian nobles rejected it and declared Casimir the Grand Duke; Władysław didn't interfere, seemingly accepting his brother as co-ruler. Władysław's disappearance during the Battle of Varna ultimately left Casimir as sole claimant to the Lithuanian throne.
- Alexander Jagiellon was chosen among Casimir's sons by Lithuanian nobles to be the next Grand Duke after his father's death, while Alexander's older brother John I Albert claimed the title of Supreme Duke.
- Sigismund the Old Jagiellon declared his son Sigismund Augustus the Grand Duke as his junior co-ruler in 1529.

Following Augustus's death, his sister Anna Jagiellon and her husband Stephen Báthory were elected by nobles as co-rulers of united Poland and Lithuania.

=== Poland ===
In the Crown of the Kingdom of Poland there were three known instances of coregency:

- Jadwiga co-ruled with her husband Władysław II Jagiełło who became king by marriage
- Sigismund II Augustus was elected as co-ruler and heir of his father Sigismund I the Old
- Anna was elected as queen regnant and Stephen Báthory was chosen as her husband and co-ruler

=== Roman Empire ===
It was common during the Principate for a Roman emperor or Augustus to appoint Caesar as designated heir and junior co-emperor, in many cases adopting them as their son, who did not necessarily have to be biologically related to them. This was merely a tradition and not a formal office until the Tetrarchy, which attempted to codify this arrangement, but quickly fell apart. It regained significance, including under Zeno, as well as when Justin I had his nephew Justinian named co-emperor shortly before his own death, Constantine IV was also named co-emperor by his father Constans II and who himself had several other co-emperors, and the practice was common in the centuries to come up through the Palaiologans.

=== Russia ===
Following the death of Tsar Feodor III of Russia in 1682, his brother Ivan and half-brother Peter were both crowned autocrats of Russia. This compromise was necessary because Ivan was unfit to rule due to physical and mental disabilities, while Peter's exclusive rule was opposed by Feodor and Ivan's older sister Sofia Alekseyevna, who led a Streltsy uprising against him and his mother's family. Because neither Tsar was of age to rule, Sofia subsequently claimed regency until she was removed from power by Peter in 1689. Ivan V and Peter I's joint reign continued, however, with Ivan maintaining formal seniority despite having little participation in the affairs of the state until his death in 1696, at which point Peter became the sole ruler.

=== Sweden ===
The monarchy in Sweden has had several periods of joint rule: Erik and Alrik, Yngvi and Alf, Björn at Hauge and Anund Uppsale, Eric the Victorious and Olof Björnsson, Eric the Victorious and Olof Skötkonung, Halsten Stenkilsson and Inge I, and Philip and Inge II.

=== Vietnam ===
Coregency is a special feature of the Trần dynasty, in which a senior king abdicated in favor of his chosen heir. This abdication, however, is only in name, as the abdicated king continued to rule while his successor sat on the throne as a learner.

== See also ==
- Condominium (international law)
- Diarchy
- Jure uxoris
- Personal union
- Tetrarchy
