= Cleopatra VI =

Possible Egyptian Ptolemaic queen

Cleopatra VI Tryphaena

Pharaoh and Queen of the Ptolemaic Kingdom
- Reign: 58–57 BC (Note: If Cleopatra V and Cleopatra VI were the same person, Cleopatra VI also co-ruled with Ptolemy XII in 79–69 BC)
- Coregency: Berenice IV
- Predecessor: Ptolemy XII
- Successor: Berenice IV
- Consort: Unknown (Note: If Cleopatra V and Cleopatra VI were the same person, Cleopatra VI's family relations are those of Cleopatra V.)
- Children: Unknown
- Father: Ptolemy XII (according to Porphyry)
- Mother: Unknown
- Born: Unknown (Note: If Cleopatra V and Cleopatra VI were the same person, Cleopatra VI's birth date is the same as Cleopatra V's birth date.)
- Died: c. 57 BC
- Dynasty: Ptolemaic

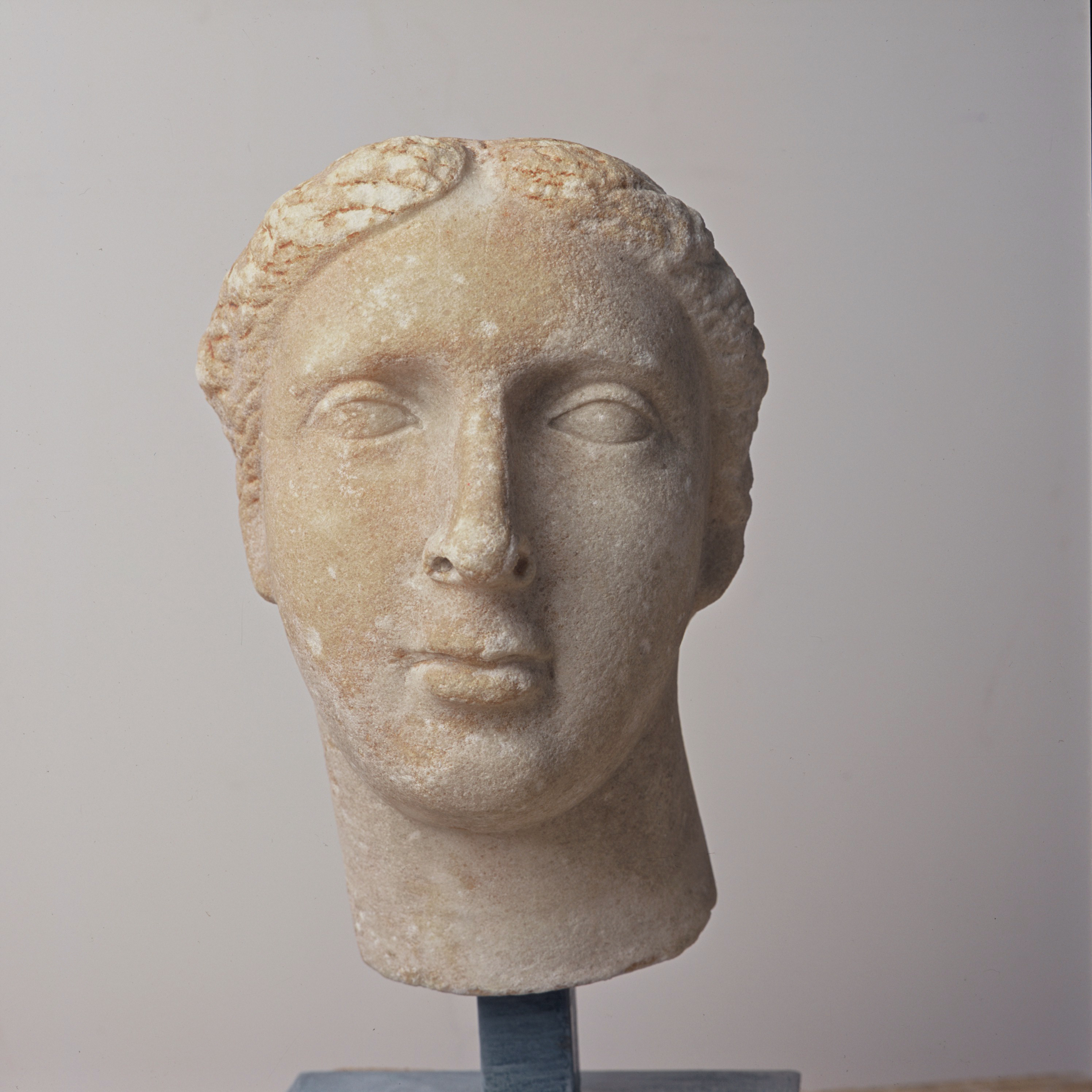
Likely sculpture of Cleopatra V Tryphaena (also known as Cleopatra VI), from Lower Egypt, 1st century BC, currently at the Musée Saint-Raymond, Toulouse, France

Cleopatra VI Tryphaena (Greek: Κλεοπάτρα Τρύφαινα, romanized: Trýphaina, lit. 'dainty') or Cleopatra Tryphaena II (died c. 57 BC) was a queen of Ptolemaic Egypt who ruled alongside Berenice IV.

Although called Cleopatra VI Tryphaena by some modern historians, she may be identical with Cleopatra V, wife of pharaoh Ptolemy XII Auletes and mother of Berenice IV. Or Cleopatra VI could have been a daughter of Ptolemy XII Auletes and thus older sibling of Berenice IV, Cleopatra VII, Ptolemy XIII, and Ptolemy XIV. After co-ruling Egypt for a year, Cleopatra VI died of unknown causes in 57 BC, after which Ptolemy XII Auletes returned to Egypt with Roman military aid to overthrow his rival daughter Berenice IV in 55 BC.

== Historical context ==
In 59 BC Julius Caesar was one of the consuls of Rome. It was believed that the annexation of Egypt was part of his own political programme, the excuse being that the king of Egypt, Ptolemy XII Auletes, was illegitimate and had no right to rule. Ptolemy however bought Caesar's support at huge expense, and the Romans passed a law to recognise Ptolemy Auletes as legitimate king of Egypt. The treaty however said nothing about Cyprus, where another Ptolemy, the brother of Ptolemy Auletes, was king.

In 58 BC the Romans annexed Cyprus, and the deposed king committed suicide. The loss of Cyprus, and the poor state of the Egyptian economy following the bribes to Caesar, triggered civil unrest in Ptolemy Auletes' capital Alexandria. Unable to quash the unrest on his own, Ptolemy Auletes went in 58 BC to Rome to ask for military support, leaving his family behind in Egypt. In his absence, the Alexandrines declared him deposed, and in his place nominated his daughter Berenice IV Epiphaneia and (according to the ancient historian Porphyry) "[Auletes'] eldest daughter" Cleopatra VI Tryphaena as joint monarchs.

Unable to muster up immediate support from the Romans, Ptolemy Auletes was initially unable take his kingdom back from the two queens. From 58 BC to the end of 57 BC he resided in Rome or at Pompey's villa in the Alban hills, busily working upon the senators by bribes or promises, and procuring the assassination of envoys sent from Alexandria to Rome; he then left Rome and went to Ephesus, and lived in the sacred precinct of Artemis. In the meantime Cleopatra Tryphaena is believed to have died in 57 BC of unknown causes, leaving the young Berenice sole queen in Alexandria for another two years. In the spring of 55 BC Ptolemy and a Roman force invaded Egypt. Berenice was defeated, and Ptolemy Auletes was installed once more as king in Alexandria by the Romans. One of Ptolemy Auletes' first acts after his restoration was to execute his daughter Berenice, for the crime of usurping his throne.

== Familial relationship of Cleopatra VI to the Ptolemaic Dynasty ==
The identity of Cleopatra VI Tryphaena or rather her familial relationship to Ptolemy XII Auletes and Berenice IV Epiphaneia, is far from clear. Reconstructing a family tree for the later generations of her family, the Ptolemaic Dynasty, cannot be accomplished with any certainty. Records for the Ptolemies of this period are far from complete, often fragmentary, and sometimes contradictory, and those attesting to the existence of Cleopatra VI Tryphaena are particularly limited. Only one source, the account of Porphyry quoted above, explicitly records Berenice IV as co-ruling with a queen named Cleopatra Tryphaena, and only Porphyry, in that same account, records Ptolemy XII Auletes as having a daughter named Cleopatra Tryphaena.

If Porphyry is correct, it is likely Cleopatra VI Tryphaena was the daughter of Ptolemy XII Auletes by his wife Cleopatra V Tryphaena. As such, Cleopatra VI Tryphaena would have been an older sister of the famous Cleopatra VII, and her birth year would be c. 75 BC. Porphyry's account is however flatly contradicted by Strabo, who reports Ptolemy XII Auletes only had three daughters: these can reliably be identified as Berenice IV, Cleopatra VII, and Arsinoe IV, leaving no room for Cleopatra VI.

Other historians suggest Cleopatra VI Tryphaena may be identical with Cleopatra V Tryphaena, the only recorded wife of Ptolemy XII Auletes. Cleopatra V Tryphaena was Queen consort of Egypt from her marriage to Ptolemy in 79 BC until her mysterious disappearance from the records in 69 BC. Some historians believe her disappearance in 69 BC was due to her death. However, a dedication on the Temple of Edfu from December 5, 57 BC reads, "Ptolemy, Young Osiris, with his Sister, queen Cleopatra, surnamed Tryphaena." The king is Ptolemy XII (who however was not present in Egypt at that time). The Cleopatra Tryphaena named by the inscription would be the king's wife rather than daughter, and it is unlikely the name would appear had Ptolemy XII's wife already died twelve years earlier. If Cleopatra V was indeed still alive in 57 BC, and in view of the account by Strabo that Ptolemy XII Auletes had only three daughters, some historians think it most likely that Berenice IV's co-queen was her mother, Cleopatra V Tryphaena, rather than (as Porphyry has it) an otherwise unattested sister.

== See also ==
- Tryphaena

== Notes ==
Cleopatra VI Ptolemaic dynasty Born: ca. 75 BC Died: 57 BC
Regnal titles
Preceded by Ptolemy XII	Pharaoh of Egypt; 58 BC-57 BC with Berenice IV	Succeeded by Berenice IV
