= Berenice IV =

Ptolemaic Queen of Egypt from 58 to 55 BC

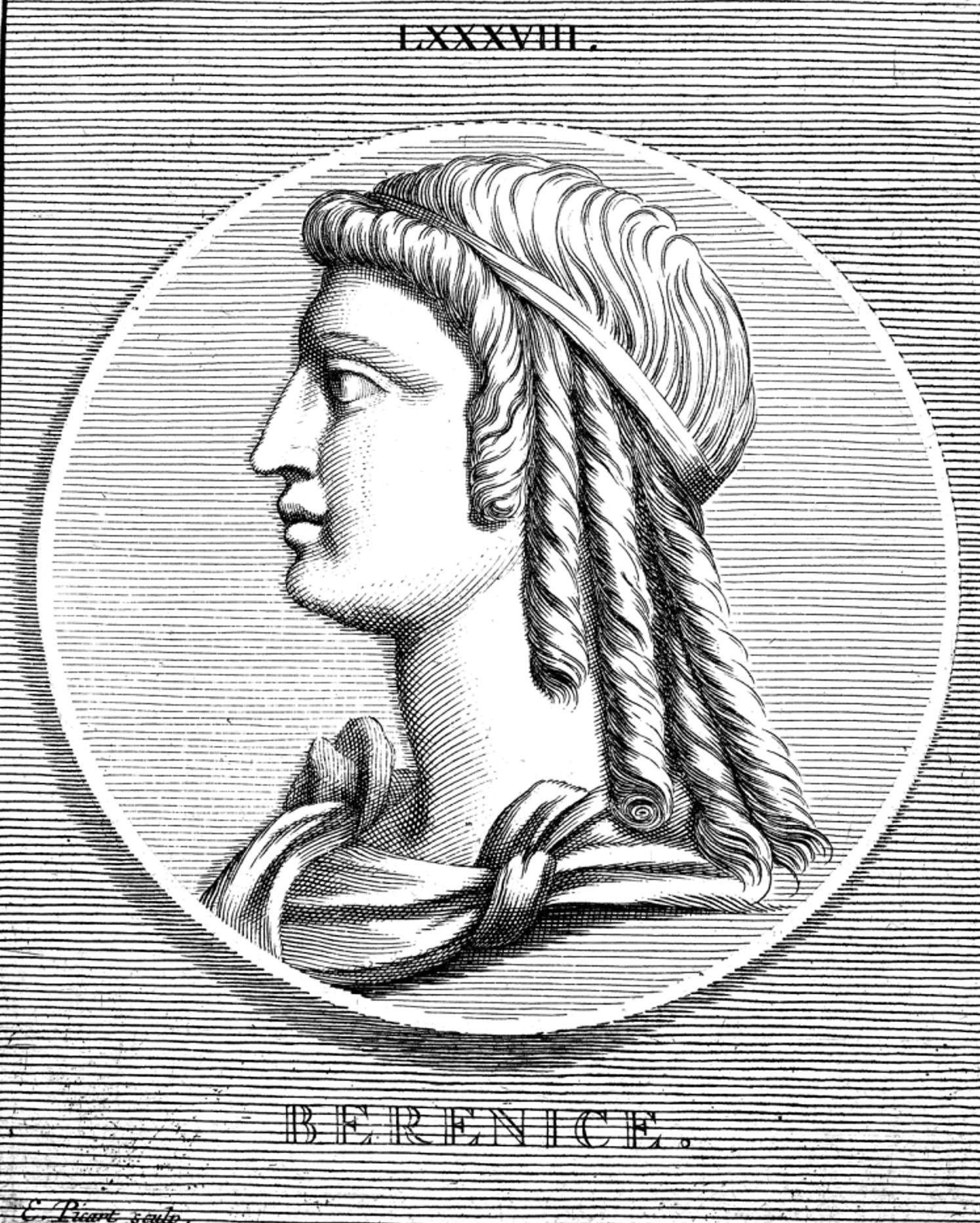

Queen of the Ptolemaic Kingdom Pharaoh of Egypt
- Reign: 58-55 BC
- Coregency: Cleopatra VI (58–57 BC) (Note: Cleopatra V and Cleopatra VI may have been the same person.)
- Predecessor: Ptolemy XII Auletes
- Successor: Ptolemy XII Auletes
- Consorts: Seleucus VII Kybiosaktes; Archelaus I of Comana
- Father: Ptolemy XII Auletes
- Mother: Cleopatra V of Egypt
- Born: c. 70s BC; Alexandria, Egypt
- Died: 55 BC; Alexandria, Egypt
- Burial: Alexandria, Egypt
- Dynasty: Ptolemaic dynasty

Berenice IV Epiphaneia (Ancient Greek: Βερενίκη; c. 70s BC–55 BC, born and died in Alexandria, Egypt) was ruling Ptolemaic queen and Hellenistic pharaoh of the Ptolemaic kingdom. From 58 to 55 BC, Berenice IV ruled Egypt during the political exile of her father Ptolemy XII Auletes to Rome. She was co-ruler of Egypt with Cleopatra VI from 58 to 57 BC, but became sole ruler in 57 BC. On the return of Ptolemy XII to Egypt with Roman military aid and an army led by Aulus Gabinius, Berenice IV was overthrown and executed by her rival father, who later bequeathed his throne to his daughter Cleopatra VII and son Ptolemy XIII as co-rulers.

== Biography ==
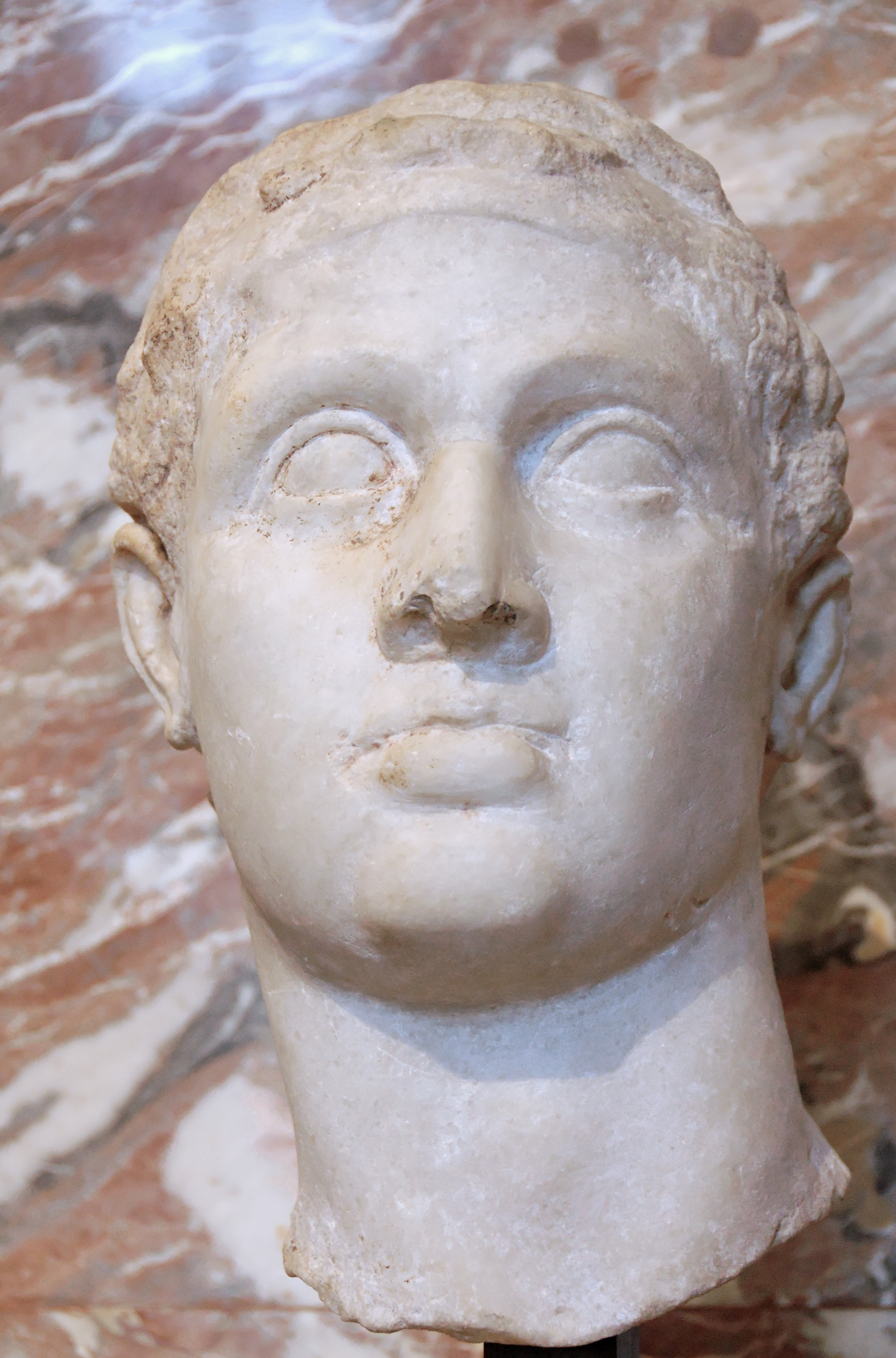
Ptolemy XII, Berenice IV's father

Berenice IV was the daughter of Ptolemy XII Auletes and Cleopatra V Tryphaena of the Ptolemaic Kingdom. She was probably born in the early 70s BC. Berenice was sister to queen Cleopatra VII, kings Ptolemy XIII Theos Philopator and Ptolemy XIV, and princess Arsinoe IV. It is unclear whether the younger children of Ptolemy XII were born to Cleopatra V or a different woman.

In 59 BC Julius Caesar was one of the consuls of Rome. It was believed that the annexation of Egypt was part of his own political programme, the excuse being that the king of Egypt, Ptolemy XII Auletes, was illegitimate and had no right to rule. Ptolemy Auletes responded by buying Caesar's support at huge expense, and the Romans passed a law to recognise Ptolemy Auletes as legitimate king of Egypt. The treaty however said nothing about Cyprus, where another Ptolemy, the brother of Ptolemy Auletes, was king.

In 58 BC the Romans annexed Cyprus, forcing the deposed king and brother of Auletes into suicide. The loss of Cyprus, and the poor state of the Egyptian economy following the bribes to Caesar, triggered civil unrest in Ptolemy Auletes' capital Alexandria. Unable to quash the unrest on his own, Ptolemy Auletes went in 58 BC to Rome to ask for military support, leaving his family behind in Egypt. In his absence, the Alexandrines declared him deposed, and in his place nominated his daughter Berenice IV Epiphaneia and (according to the ancient historian Porphyry) "[Auletes'] eldest daughter" Cleopatra VI Tryphaena as joint monarchs. Some, though not all, modern historians believe Porphyry made an error here, and that Cleopatra VI Tryphaena was in fact Ptolemy XII Auletes' wife Cleopatra V Tryphaena. Porphyry is the only source to mention the existence of a fourth daughter of Ptolemy XII, but this does not disprove the idea that he had an additional daughter named Cleopatra VI.

Unable to muster up immediate support from the Romans, Ptolemy Auletes was initially unable to take his kingdom back from the two queens. From 58 till the end of 57 he resided in Rome or at Pompey's villa in the Alban hills, busily working upon the senators by bribes or promises, and procuring the assassination of envoys sent from Alexandria to Rome; he then left Rome and went to Ephesus, and lived in the sacred precinct of Artemis. Cleopatra Tryphaena is believed to have died in 57 BC of unknown causes, leaving Berenice as sole queen.

As a lone woman ruling Egypt, she was expected to marry and have a man as a co-regent. Her advisors first tried to arrange a marriage with two Seleucid princes, both descended from Ptolemy VIII. The first was a son of Cleopatra Selene of Syria: he died whilst negotiations were in progress. The second was a grandson of Tryphaena and Antiochus VIII Grypus called Philip (possibly Philip II Philoromaeus): he was forbidden by the Roman governor of Syria Aulus Gabinius to accept the invitation. The Alexandrines then, thirdly, arranged a marriage with a man called Seleucus, connected to the Seleucid royal house. He may have been another son of Cleopatra Selene of Syria, perhaps Seleucus VII Philometor; alternatively he may have been an illegitimate son of one of the Seleucid kings. When he arrived in Alexandria, the Alexandrines were shocked by his vulgar appearance and manners, and nicknamed him Kybiosaktes, "Salt-fish-monger". Berenice, after a few days of marriage, found she was unable to bear his coarseness and vulgarity, and felt that he could not command the respect of the populace: she had him strangled. The court then arranged a marriage with a Greek called Archelaus. Archelaus had been appointed prince-pontiff at the temple of the Great Mother at Comana in Pontus by Pompey, and claimed to be a son of King Mithridates VI of Pontus (and, if so, to be distantly related in blood to the Ptolemies). Strabo instead says his father was Archelaus, one of the chief marshals of Mithridates VI in the First Mithridatic War who defected to the Romans. At that time Archelaus was an associate of Aulus Gabinius, and had hoped to join with him on an expedition against the Parthians. Gabinius furthermore had become suspicious of Archelaus's associations with the Egyptians, and had him arrested. Persuaded though that Archelaus was no threat, and perhaps bribed, Gabinius voluntarily released him. In the winter 56‑55 Archelaus came to Egypt, married Berenice, and was given a title of king, although he is not known to be mentioned in documents as his wife's formal co-ruler, and it's presumed she never allowed him to become one.

In 55 BC, Aulus Gabinius invaded Egypt with a Roman army, and Archelaus died in battle attempting to defend the kingdom. Gabinius re-installed Ptolemy Auletes as king, who executed Berenice for the crime of usurping his throne. He would later bequeath his throne to two siblings of Berenice IV: Cleopatra VII and Ptolemy XIII.

== See also ==
- List of Syrian monarchs
- Timeline of Syrian history

== Sources ==
- Dio Cassius 39.12 - 39.14, 39.55 - 39.58

Berenice IV Ptolemaic dynasty Born: c. 77 BC Died: 55 BC
Regnal titles
Preceded by Ptolemy XII	Pharaoh of Egypt; 58 BC–55 BC with Cleopatra VI	Succeeded by Ptolemy XII
