= Cleopatra V =

Ptolemaic Queen of Egypt

Cleopatra V of Egypt
- Cleopatra V Tryphaena
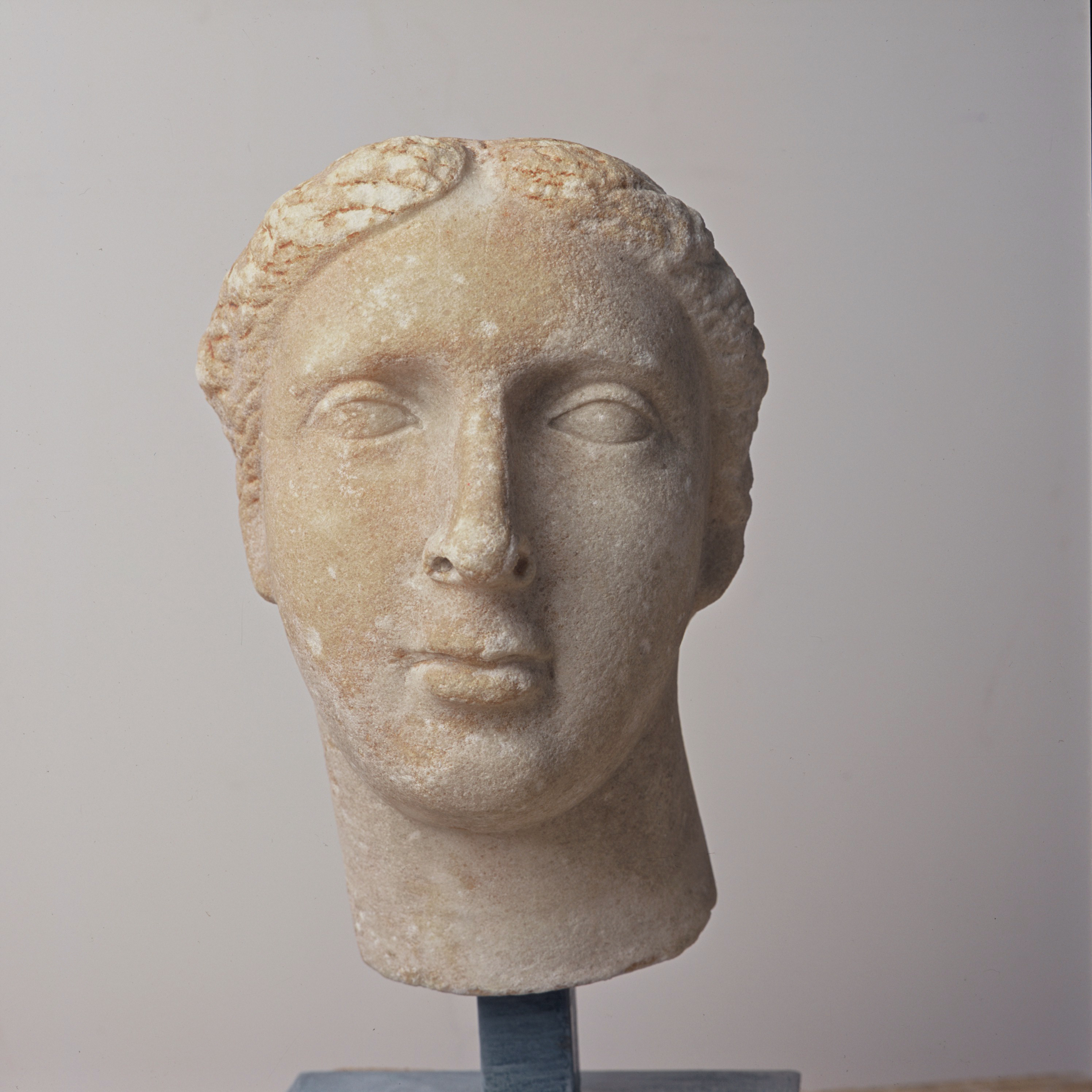
- A likely sculpture of Cleopatra V Tryphaena, (Note: Cleopatra V and Cleopatra VI may have been the same person.) 1st century BC, from Lower Egypt, now in the Musée Saint-Raymond

Queen of the Ptolemaic Kingdom Pharaoh of Egypt
- Reign: 79–69 BC with Ptolemy XII (Note: If Cleopatra V and Cleopatra VI were the same person, Cleopatra V also co-ruled with Berenice IV in 58–57 BC)
- Predecessor: Ptolemy XII
- Successor: Ptolemy XII
- Consort: Ptolemy XII
- Children: Known: Berenice IV; Probably: Cleopatra VII; Possibly: Cleopatra VI; Arsinoe IV; Ptolemy XIII; Ptolemy XIV
- Father: Uncertain: Ptolemy IX or Ptolemy X
- Mother: Uncertain: Cleopatra IV or Berenice III
- Born: c. 100/95 BC
- Died: c. 69–68 BC (Note: If Cleopatra V and Cleopatra VI were the same person, Cleopatra V died in 57 BC, the same year Cleopatra VI died.)
- Dynasty: Ptolemaic dynasty

Cleopatra V (Greek: Κλεοπάτρα Τρύφαινα; died c. 69–68 BC) was a Ptolemaic Queen of Egypt. She is the only surely attested wife of Ptolemy XII. Her only known child is Berenice IV, but she was also possibly the mother of Cleopatra VII. It is unclear if she died around the time of Cleopatra VII's birth in 69 BC. If she did not die in c. 69 BC, she may be the same person as the co-ruler of Berenice IV, known as Cleopatra VI. No written records about Cleopatra VI exist after 57 BC. Berenice IV was overthrown by Ptolemy XII in 55 BC, when his throne was restored with Roman military aid.

== Descent and marriage ==
Because of the poor body of source material Cleopatra V is a very obscure member of the Ptolemaic dynasty, only a few ascertained facts about her are known and many aspects of her life are the subject to controversy. In all known ancient sources she is given the byname Tryphaena. She may have borne this name before accession to the throne when she assumed the traditional royal name Cleopatra. In some modern specialist literature Cleopatra Tryphaena, wife of Ptolemy XII, is referred to as Cleopatra VI. The historian Werner Huß refers to her as Cleopatra VII Tryphaena.

The parentage of Cleopatra V is not recorded. She may have been a legitimate or illegitimate daughter of Ptolemy IX or the legitimate daughter of Ptolemy X. Porphyry mentions that Ptolemy X Alexander fled Egypt with his wife Berenice III and a daughter in 88 BC. Cleopatra Tryphaena might be this unspecified daughter.

Cleopatra V is first mentioned in 79 BC in two papyri. One of these papyri dates from January 17, 79 BC. In that year she married Ptolemy XII, king of Egypt. They received divine worship as theoí Philopátores kai Philádelphoi (father-, brother- and sister-loving gods). Cleopatra’s Egyptian titles, found primarily at Edfu and Philae, include Daughter of Re, Female Ruler, and Mistress of Two Lands.

== Death and identity ==
It is unclear how long Cleopatra V lived, and with which mentions of Cleopatra Tryphaena in the historical record she should be identified, as the numbering used to distinguish the Ptolemies is a modern invention. Cleopatra Tryphaena V vanishes around the time Cleopatra VII was born (69 BC): her name begins to disappear from monuments and papyri, and there is a papyrus of Ptolemy XII from 69 BC that does not mention her but would be expected to do so had she still been alive.

There is some indication that Cleopatra may have died in 69 BC — she may have died in childbirth or was possibly murdered. Should she really have died that early, then the Cleopatra Tryphaena who is mentioned — after the expulsion of Ptolemy XII — as co-ruler of Egypt (together with Berenice IV) in 58 and 57 BC, and died around 57 BC, must be her daughter, numbered by some historians as Cleopatra VI Tryphaena. This is also supported by Porphyry.

On the other hand, there is a dedication on the Temple of Edfu from December 5, 57 BC that inscribes Cleopatra Tryphaena's name alongside Ptolemy XII's (who however was not present in Egypt at that time), which would have meant the king's wife rather than daughter and would be unlikely had Ptolemy XII's wife really died already twelve years earlier. Thus some, though not all, modern historians consider Cleopatra V to be identical with the purported Cleopatra VI Tryphaena, and have her living to c. 57 BC. This would comport with the account by Strabo, who reports Ptolemy XII to have had only three daughters; these can reliably be identified as Berenice IV, Cleopatra VII, and Arsinoe IV as the king's daughters, so that there would not be left any room for a Cleopatra VI. Werner Huss assumes, that quarrels erupted between Cleopatra V and Ptolemy XII in 69 BC and that as a result of these disputes Cleopatra V fell in disgrace and was compelled to resign.

Cleopatra V was probably the mother of Cleopatra VII. Michael Grant comes to the conclusion that "on the whole" it seems most likely Cleopatra V was the mother of Cleopatra VII, noting that had Cleopatra VII been illegitimate, her "numerous Roman enemies would have revealed this to the world." He continues that we should rule out the hypothesis Cleopatra VII was conceived by Ptolemy XII's second wife-to-be while Cleopatra V was on the scene, and that if this unknown second wife had been Cleopatra VII's mother and had later become a legitimized queen, Cleopatra VII would still have been considered a bastard and "her Roman foes would not have missed the hint." Duane W. Roller speculates that Cleopatra could have been the daughter of a theoretical half-Macedonian-Greek, half-Egyptian woman belonging to a family of priests dedicated to Ptah and was "only technically illegitimate" (however, he contends that whatever Cleopatra's ancestry, she valued her Greek Ptolemaic heritage the most), but notes that if this unknown woman was not Cleopatra's mother, then Cleopatra V would be her mother. Part of his argument is based on Strabo's mention of Ptolemy XII's having only three daughters, Berenice being the only legitimate one. But as Grant notes that, of all the attacks on Cleopatra VII, her being illegitimate is not among them, and it is only mentioned in a casual statement by Strabo.

Most scholars agree that Berenice IV was a daughter of Cleopatra V. A different wife of Ptolemy XII may have been the mother of the younger siblings of Cleopatra VII: Arsinoe IV, Ptolemy XIII and Ptolemy XIV. However, Christopher Bennett thinks that Cleopatra V was the mother of all known children of Ptolemy XII. In 55 BC, upon his return to Egypt from exile with Roman military aid, Ptolemy XII had his rival daughter Berenice IV executed for usurping his throne.

== Bibliography ==
- Bennett, Christopher J. (1997). "Cleopatra V Tryphæna and the Genealogy of the Later Ptolemies". Ancient Society. 28: 39–66. doi:10.2143/AS.28.0.630068. ISSN 0066-1619. JSTOR 44079777. (registration required)
- Bianchi, Steven (2005). "Cleopatra VII". The Oxford Encyclopedia of Ancient Egypt. Oxford University Press.
- Grant, Michael (1972), Cleopatra, Edison, NJ: Barnes and Noble Books, pp. 4, 5, ISBN 978-0880297257.
- Jones, Prudence J. (2006), Cleopatra: a sourcebook, Norman, Oklahoma: University of Oklahoma Press, ISBN 9780806137414.
- Kleiner, Diana E. E. (2005), Cleopatra and Rome, Cambridge, MA: Belknap Press of Harvard University Press, ISBN 9780674019058.
- Meadows, Andrew (2001), "Sins of the fathers; the inheritance of Cleopatra, last queen of Egypt", in Walker, Susan; Higgs, Peter (eds.), Cleopatra of Egypt: from History to Myth, Princeton, NJ: British Museum Press), pp. 14–31, ISBN 978-0714119434
- Preston, Diana (2009), Cleopatra and Antony, New York: Walker & Company, ISBN 978-0802710598.
- Roller, Duane W. (2010), Cleopatra: a biography, Oxford: Oxford University Press, ISBN 9780195365535.
- Schiff, Stacy (2011), Cleopatra: A Life, UK: Random House, ISBN 978-0316001946.
- Tyldesley, Joyce (2008), Cleopatra, Last Queen of Egypt, Profile Books Ltd
- Watterson, Barbara (2020). Cleopatra: Fact and Fiction. Amberley Publishing. ISBN 978-1-445-66965-6.
- Whitehorne, John (1994). Cleopatras. Routledge. ISBN 0-415-05806-6.

Cleopatra V Ptolemaic dynasty Born: ca. 95 BC Died: ca. 69/68-57 BC
Regnal titles
Preceded by Ptolemy XII	Pharaoh of Egypt; 79 BC–68 BC with Ptolemy XII	Succeeded by Ptolemy XII
