= Stanley M. Burstein =

American historian (born 1941)

Stanley Mayer Burstein
- Born: September 16, 1941 (age 84); Methuen, Massachusetts
- Scientific career
- Fields: History

Stanley Mayer Burstein is a historian whose writings primarily concern the Hellenistic period. He is Professor Emeritus of history at California State University, Los Angeles, and the former Chair of the Department of History. He also served as secretary-treasurer and president of the Association of Ancient Historians.

== Life ==
Burstein was born on September 16, 1941, in Massachusetts. He married in 1966 and had two children. He received a PhD from the University of California, Los Angeles. He wrote many textbooks which are used by Common Core including The World from 1000 BCE to 300 CE and A Brief History of Ancient Greece, International Edition: Politics, Society, and Culture.

=== Awards ===
Burstein was awarded the California State University, Los Angeles Outstanding Professor Award (1993) and President's Distinguished Professor Award (1997) along with the 2004 Wang Family Excellence Award.
