= Archelaus (high priest of Comana Cappadocia) =

- Basileus

King consort of Egypt
- Tenure: 56-55 BC
- Predecessor: Seleukos Kybiosactes (as husband of Queen regnant)
- Successor: Ptolemy XIII (as co-ruling husband of Queen regnant)
- Died: Early 55 BC
- Spouse: Unknown first wife, Berenice IV
- Issue: 2

Archelaus I (Greek: Ἀρχέλαος Α΄; fl. 1st century BC, died January/February 55 BC) was a high priest of the temple-state of Comana in Cappadocia who later became Egyptian king consort as second husband of Pharaoh Berenice IV.

== Family background ==
Archelaus was a Cappadocian Greek nobleman, possibly of Macedonian descent. He was the first son and namesake of the Pontic high-ranking officer Archelaus who participated in the Mithridatic Wars while his brother was the Pontic soldier Diogenes, who served in the army of King Mithridates VI of Pontus. His paternal uncle was the distinguished Pontic General Neoptolemus and the family of Archelaus were active in the Pontic Court.

The identity of his mother is unknown. Archelaus was descended from King Mithridates VI of Pontus. According to Strabo, Archelaus claimed to be a son of Mithridates VI, but this claim is not plausible. Chronologically, Archelaus may have been a maternal grandson of the Pontic King; his father, Mithridates VI's favorite general, may have married one of the daughters of Mithridates VI. There is a possibility that the mother of Archelaus may have been a Pontic princess, one of the daughters born from the concubine of Mithridates VI.

== Career ==
He had a homonymous character. In 63 BC, the Roman Triumvir, General Pompey, appointed Archelaus as High Priest and Roman Client King of the temple state of Comana, Cappadocia. When Pompey raised him to the priesthood, Archelaus became the priest of the Roman Goddess of War, Bellona. The dignity of the priest to the Goddess at Comana conferred upon the person who held it the power of a monarch over the place and its immediate vicinity.

Archelaus had control over the temple serfs, numbering 6,000, and he was not empowered to sell them. A considerable revenue accrued to the priest from the associated territories. By the time of his appointed priesthood and rule, Archelaus had married an unnamed Greek woman as his first wife and she died by 56 BC. From his first wife, he had two children: one son called Archelaus and an unnamed daughter.

In 56 BC the Proconsul of Syria, Aulus Gabinius, was making preparations for the Parthian War and Archelaus travelled to Syria to offer his assistance to Gabinius. As Archelaus planned his trip to Syria, the Greek Ptolemaic Queen Berenice IV of Egypt wished to marry a prince of royal blood.

== Remarriage ==
In the summer of 56 BC, Archelaus travelled to Alexandria, Egypt, to offer his hand in marriage to Berenice IV, claiming to be the son of Mithridates VI. Archelaus gave Berenice IV personal gifts and showed his military capabilities to woo her into marriage. Some time later, Archelaus and Berenice IV married. It was the second marriage for both. Archelaus is referred by Strabo as "king", however he was never mentioned in known Egyptian papyri and ostraca as co-ruler of his wife. It was thought that a certain papyrus, mentioning king and queen ruling together, refers to Berenice IV and Archelaus, however it was reassigned to reign of Berenice III - it's therefore unknown if Archealos was ever recognized in Egypt as his wife's equal, as no dating protocol from time of their marriage has been found yet. Egyptologist Kara Cooney asseses that Berenice "never allowed him [Archelaus] to actually act as co-regent, keeping him meekly in his place".

== War and death ==
The Roman Senate would not allow Archelaus to take part in the Parthian War. Either Archelaus left Gabinius in secret or Gabinius was induced by bribes to assist Archelaus in his hand-in-marriage for Berenice IV, while at the same time Gabinius received bribes from the father of Berenice IV, Ptolemy XII Auletes, to assist him to be restored to the Egyptian throne.

Archelaus enjoyed the honor of being the husband of Berenice IV for only six months, as Gabinius kept his promise to the father of Berenice IV. In January/February 55 BC, Ptolemy XII Auletes marched on Egypt with an army to reclaim his throne. In the fighting, Archelaus had died. Berenice IV and his daughter from his first marriage were put to death. The future Roman Triumvir Mark Antony, who was a friend of his family, had Archelaus’ body searched among the dead and buried Archelaus in a manner worthy of a King.

His son succeeded him as High Priest and Ruler at Comana.
