= Ptolemy XIV Philopator =

Pharaoh of Egypt from 47 to 44 BC

- Πτολεμαίος Φιλοπάτωρ
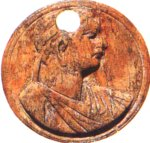
- 1st-century Roman ivory game counter with an imaginary portrait of Ptolemy XIV. An inscription in the back reads άδελφός Κλε(ο)πάτρας ("Cleopatra's brother").

King of the Ptolemaic Kingdom Pharaoh of Egypt
- Reign: Early 47 – August 44 BC
- Coregency: Cleopatra VII
- Predecessor: Cleopatra VII and Ptolemy XIII Theos Philopator
- Successor: Cleopatra VII and Ptolemy XV Caesar
- Consort: Cleopatra VII
- Father: Ptolemy XII Auletes
- Born: c. 59 BC
- Died: August 44 BC (aged approx. 15)
- Dynasty: Ptolemaic dynasty

Ptolemy XIV Philopator (Ancient Greek: Πτολεμαῖος Φιλοπάτωρ, Ptolemaios; c. 59 – 44 BC) was nominally pharaoh of Ptolemaic Egypt, reigning with his sister-wife Cleopatra from 47 BC until his death in 44 BC.

== Biography ==
Following the death of his older brother Ptolemy XIII of Egypt on 13 January 47 BC, and according to his will, he was proclaimed Pharaoh and co-ruler by their older sister and remaining Pharaoh, Cleopatra VII of Egypt. He was about 12 years old when he acceded to the throne. He and his older sister, Cleopatra, were married, but Cleopatra continued to act as lover of Roman dictator Julius Caesar. Ptolemy is considered to have reigned in name only, as a concession to Egyptian tradition, with Cleopatra keeping actual authority.

On 15 March 44 BC Caesar was murdered in Rome by a group of conspirators whose most notable members were Brutus and Cassius. Ptolemy died sometime after. An inscription mentioning him as alive was dated at 26 July 44 BC. It has been assumed but remains uncertain that Cleopatra poisoned her co-ruler, with aconite, to replace him with his nephew Ptolemy XV Caesar, her son by Caesar who was proclaimed co-ruler on 2 September 44 BC and whom his mother intended to support as successor of his father.

Ptolemy XIV Philopator Ptolemaic dynasty Born: c. 59 BC Died: 44 BC
Preceded by Ptolemy XIII; Cleopatra VII	Pharaoh of Egypt; 47–44 BC with Cleopatra VII	Succeeded by Cleopatra VII; Ptolemy XV Caesar
