= Ptolemy XIII Theos Philopator =

Pharaoh of Egypt from 51 to 47 BC

- Πτολεμαίος Θεός Φιλοπάτωρ
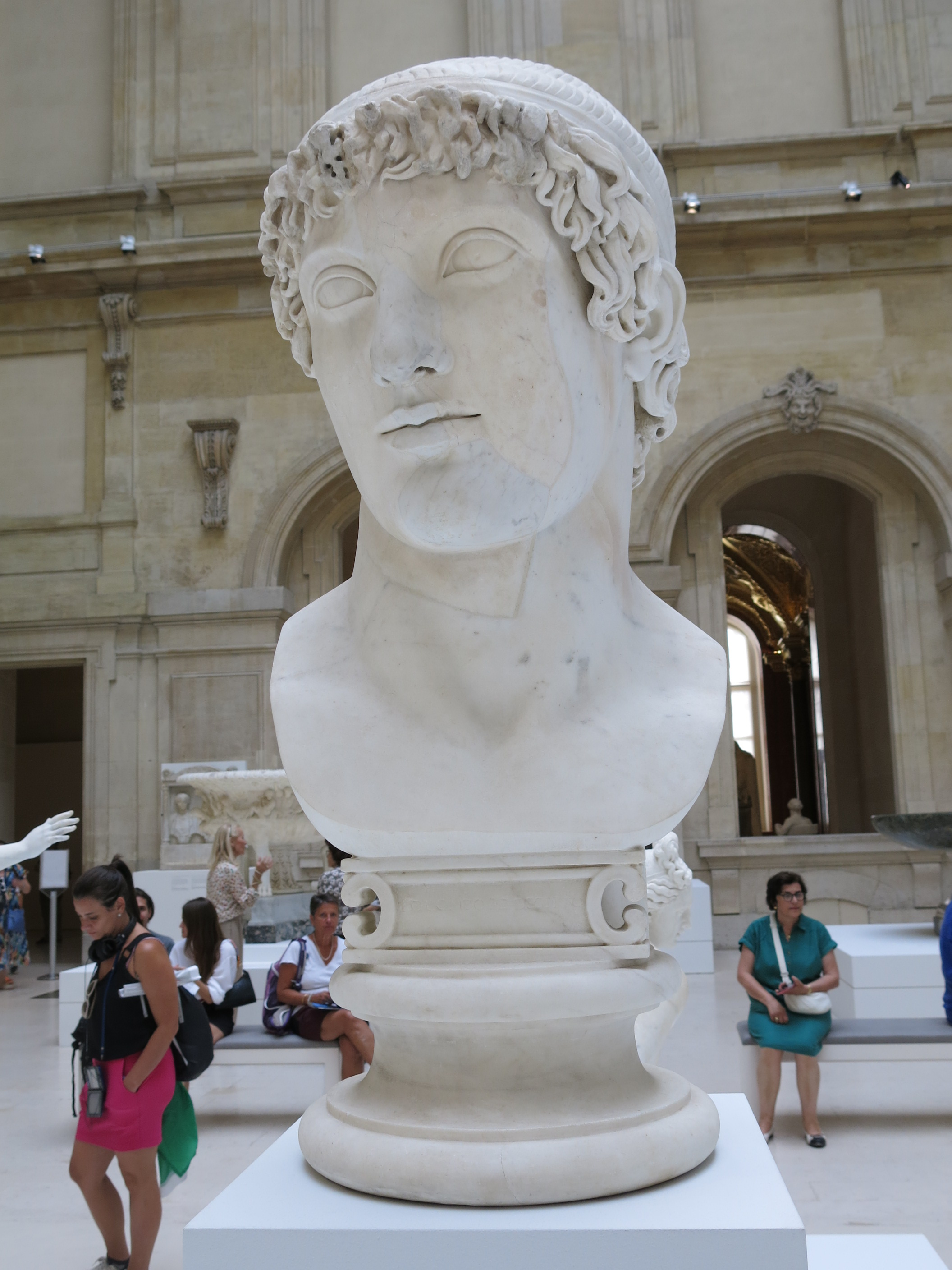
- A bust of Ptolemy c. 130–140 AD in the Louvre, restored by Bartolomeo Cavaceppi

King of the Ptolemaic Kingdom Pharaoh of Egypt
- Reign: 51–47 BC
- Coregency: Cleopatra VII, Arsinoe IV (disputed; in opposition to Cleopatra VII)
- Predecessor: Ptolemy XII Auletes
- Successor: Cleopatra VII and Ptolemy XIV Philopator
- Consort: Cleopatra VII
- Father: Ptolemy XII Auletes
- Born: c. 62 BC
- Died: prob. 13 January 47 BC (aged 14); Nile river
- Dynasty: Ptolemaic

Ptolemy XIII Theos Philopator (Ancient Greek: Πτολεμαῖος Θεός Φιλοπάτωρ, Ptolemaĩos; c. 62 BC – 13 January 47 BC) was Pharaoh of Egypt from 51 to 47 BC, and one of the last members of the Ptolemaic dynasty (305–30 BC). He was the son of Ptolemy XII and the brother of and co-ruler with Cleopatra VII. Cleopatra's exit from Egypt caused a civil war to break out between the pharaohs. Ptolemy later ruled jointly with his other sister, Arsinoe IV.

== Biography ==
=== Co-ruler of Egypt ===
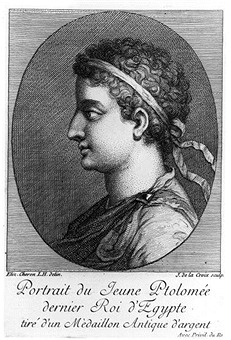
An engraving by Élisabeth Sophie Chéron, published c. 1736, based on a 1st-century BC medallion

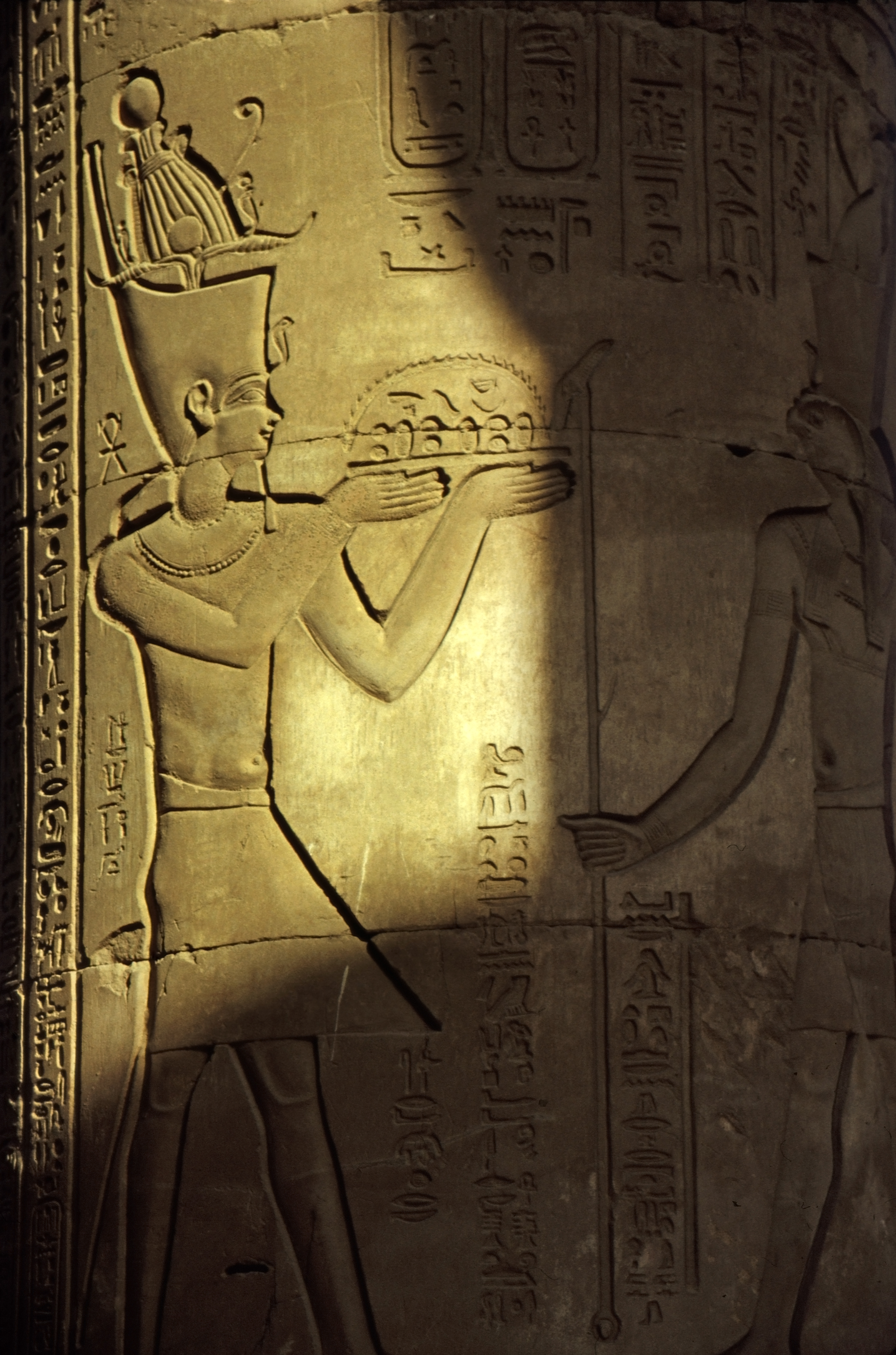
Relief of Ptolemy XIII from the Temple of Kom Ombo

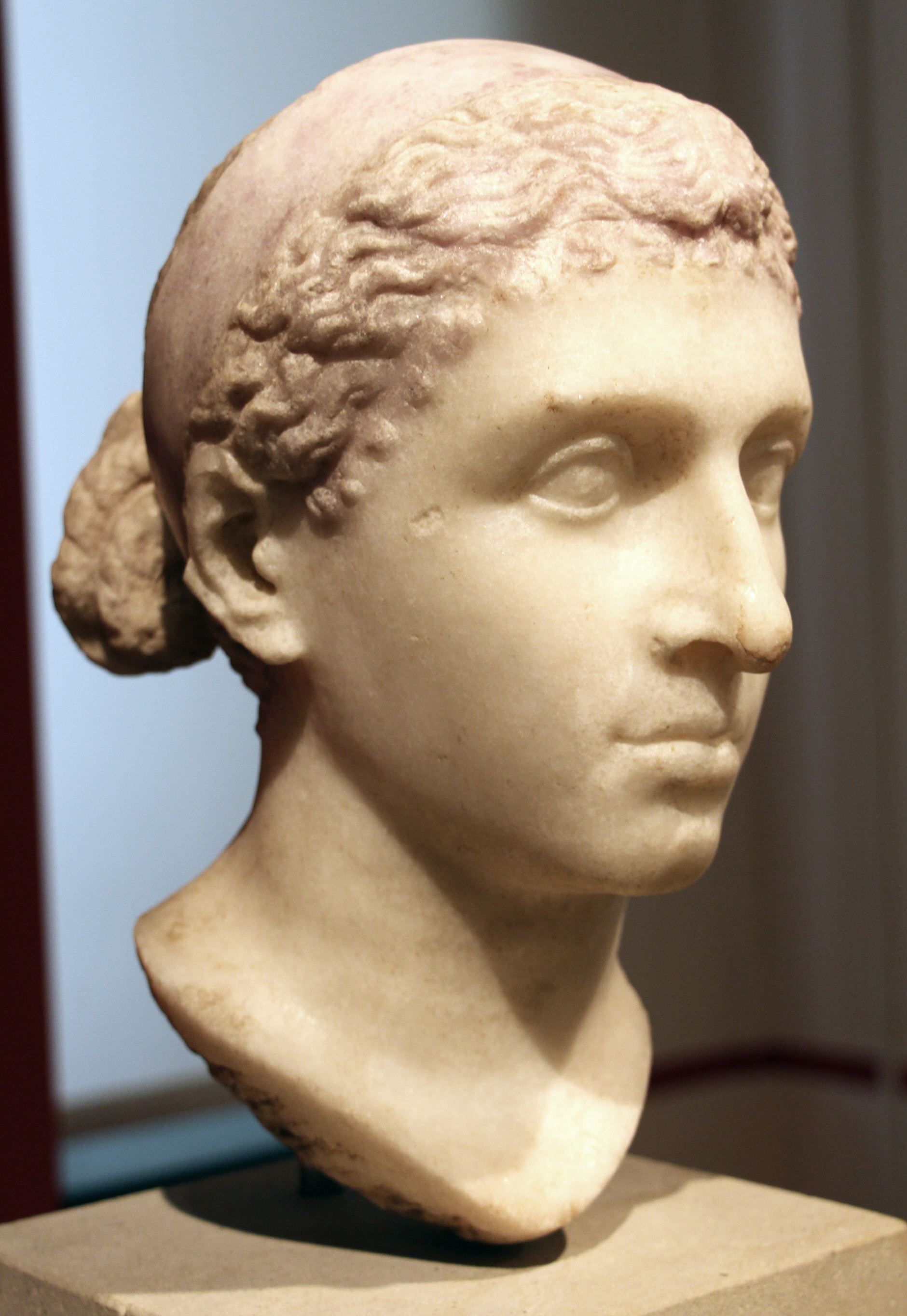
Cleopatra, Ptolemy XIII's sister-wife (Altes Museum)

Son of the Egyptian Pharaoh Ptolemy XII (r. 80–58 BC and 55–51 BC), Ptolemy XIII succeeded his father as pharaoh of the Ptolemaic Kingdom in the spring of 51 BC at the age of 11. His father had stipulated that Ptolemy XIII would be married to his older sister Cleopatra (ruled from 51–30 BC), with the couple ruling as co-rulers. In October 50 BC, Ptolemy XIII was promoted to senior ruler along with her, although the eunuch Pothinus acted as regent for him.

In the spring of 48 BC, Ptolemy XIII and Pothinus attempted to depose Cleopatra due to her increasing status as queen. Her face appeared on minted coins, for example, while Ptolemy XIII's name was omitted on official documents. Ptolemy intended to become main ruler, with Pothinus acting as the power behind the throne.

=== Civil war ===
Ptolemy XIII and Pothinus managed to force Cleopatra to flee to Syria, but she soon organized her own army and a civil war began in Egypt. Soon their other sister started to claim the throne as Arsinoe IV of Egypt (r. 48–47 BC), further complicating the situation.

At this point, defeated Roman general Pompey the Great came to Egypt seeking refuge from his pursuing rival Julius Caesar. Initially, Ptolemy XIII pretended to have accepted his request, but on 29 September 48 BC, he had the general murdered by Achillas and Lucius Septimius in hopes of winning favor with Caesar when the victorious general arrived.

When Caesar arrived he was presented with the head of his deceased rival and former ally, but reportedly, instead of being pleased, Caesar reacted with disgust and ordered that Pompey's body be located and given a proper Roman funeral. Cleopatra VII proved more successful in winning Caesar's favor and became his lover. Caesar arranged the execution of Pothinus and the official return to the throne of Cleopatra VII, though she had never officially abdicated her marriage to Ptolemy XIII.

Still determined to depose Cleopatra VII, Ptolemy XIII allied himself with Arsinoe IV. Jointly, they organized the factions of the army loyal to them against those loyal to Cleopatra VII and the relatively small part of Caesar's army that had accompanied him to Egypt. The battle between the warring factions occurred in mid-December 48 BC inside Alexandria itself (Siege of Alexandria (47 BC)), which suffered serious damage. Around this time, the burning of the Library of Alexandria occurred.

Upon the arrival of Roman reinforcements, the Battle of the Nile (47 BC) ensued and resulted in a victory for Caesar and Cleopatra, forcing Ptolemy XIII to flee the city. He reportedly drowned on 13 January 47 BC while attempting to cross the Nile river. Whether he was attempting to flee or was seeking negotiations remains uncertain from sources of the time. Cleopatra VII remained the unchallenged ruler of Egypt, although she named their younger brother Ptolemy XIV of Egypt (r. 47–44 BC) her new co-ruler.

== Cultural depictions ==
Ptolemy appears in George Frideric Handel's 1724 opera Giulio Cesare in Egitto ("Julius Caesar in Egypt") and George Bernard Shaw's play Caesar and Cleopatra, and was played by Richard O'Sullivan in the 1963 motion picture Cleopatra. Ptolemy and his fight with Caesar and Cleopatra for control of Egypt also feature in the HBO TV series Rome episode "Caesarion".

Ptolemy's civil war with Cleopatra figures prominently in the 2017 historical video game Assassin's Creed Origins, which incorporates historical events into an original story. Ptolemy is depicted as a weak puppet ruler to the Order of Ancients, the precursor to the Templar Order in the game, who drove him to depose his sister. During the Battle of the Nile, main character Aya draws an arrow to kill him, but holds back as his boat is attacked by crocodiles, causing him to fall into the river and drown.

Ptolemy XIII Theos Philopator Ptolemaic dynasty Born: c. 62 BC Died: c. 47 BC
Regnal titles
Preceded by Ptolemy XII and Cleopatra VII	Pharaoh of Egypt; 51 – c. 47 BC with Cleopatra VII; Arsinoe IV	Succeeded by Cleopatra and Ptolemy XIV
