= Cleopatra =

Pharaoh of Egypt from 51 to 30 BC

Cleopatra VII
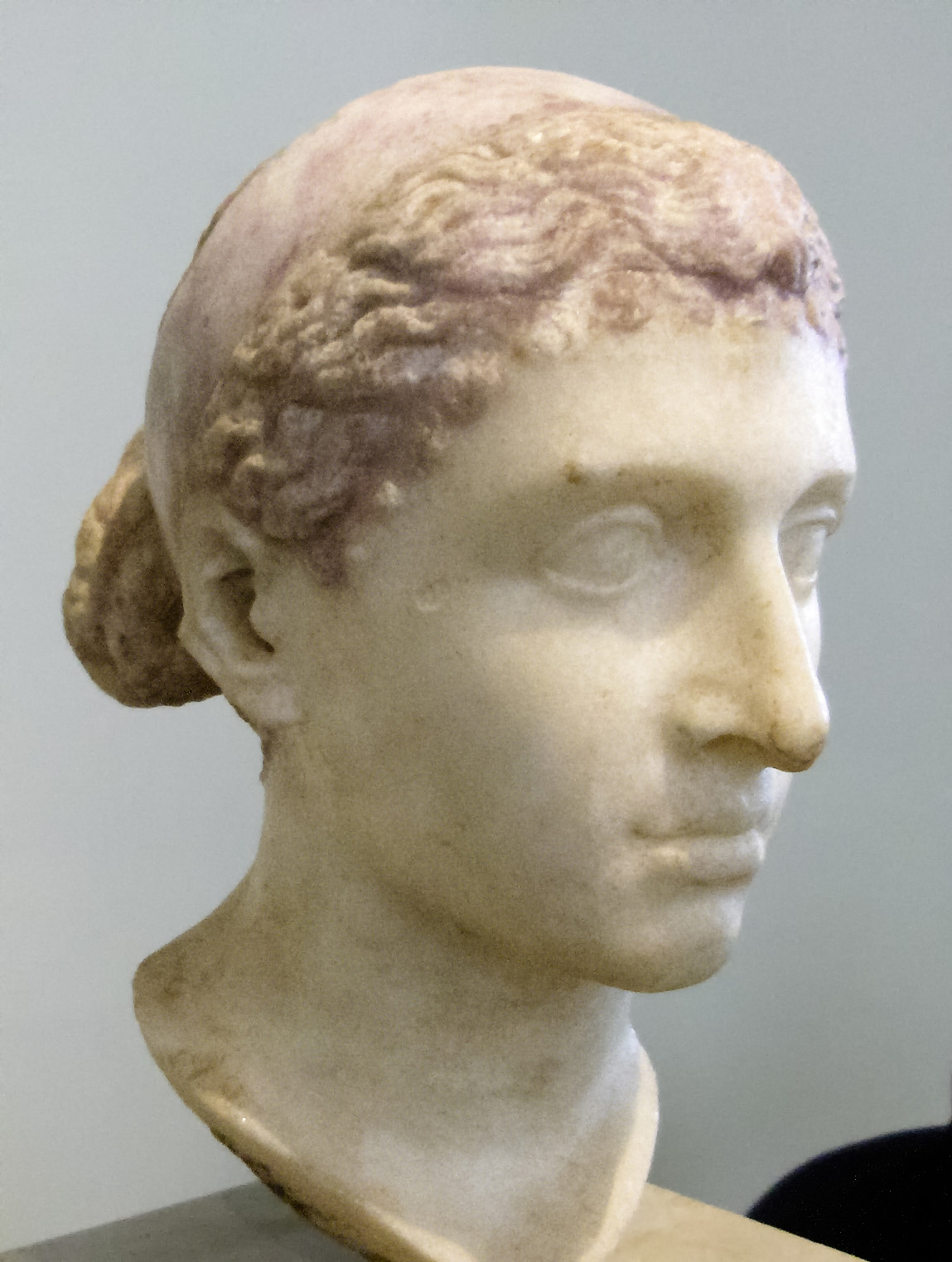
- The Berlin Cleopatra, a Roman sculpture of Cleopatra wearing a royal diadem, mid-1st century BC, now in the Altes Museum, Germany (Note: The sculpture was made around the time of Cleopatra's visits to Rome in 46–44 BC and was discovered in an Italian villa along the Via Appia. For further validation about the Berlin Cleopatra, see Pina Polo (2013, pp. 184–186), Roller (2010, pp. 54, 174–175), Jones (2006, p. 33), and Hölbl (2001, p. 234).)

Queen of the Ptolemaic Kingdom Pharaoh of Egypt
- Reign: 51–30 BC (21 years)
- Coregency: See list: Ptolemy XIII (51–47 BC); Ptolemy XIV (47–44 BC); Ptolemy XV (44–30 BC)
- Predecessor: Ptolemy XII Auletes
- Successor: Ptolemy XV Caesarion
Royal titulary
Horus name
Wr(.t)-nb(.t)-nfrw-ꜣḫ(t)-sḥ
Wer(et)-neb(et)-neferu-achet-seh
The great Lady of perfection, excellent in counsel
G5	wr r nb nfr nfr nfr H2 x O22
Wr.t-twt-n-jt=s
Weret-tut-en-it-es
The great one, sacred image of her father
G5	wr t r t W t A53 n X2 t z
Nomen
Qlwjwꜣpꜣdrtꜣ
Cleopatra

G39 N5	q rw i wA p A d r t A H8
epithet to nomen:
Qlwpdrt nṯrt mr(t) jts
Cleopatra netjeret mer(et) ites
The goddess Cleopatra who is beloved of her father

G39 N5	q rw W p d r t H8 nTr t H8 R7 t z N36
- Consorts: Ptolemy XIII Theos Philopator; Ptolemy XIV; Mark Antony
- Children: Caesarion; Alexander Helios; Cleopatra Selene II; Ptolemy Philadelphus
- Father: Ptolemy XII Auletes
- Mother: Presumably Cleopatra V Tryphaena (Note: Grant (1972, pp. 3–4, 17), Fletcher (2008, pp. 69, 74, 76), Jones (2006, p. xiii), Preston (2009, p. 22), Schiff (2011, p. 28) and Burstein (2004, p. 11) label the wife of Ptolemy XII Auletes as Cleopatra V Tryphaena, while Dodson & Hilton (2004, pp. 268–269, 273) and Roller (2010, p. 18) call her Cleopatra VI Tryphaena, due to the confusion in primary sources conflating these two figures, who may have been one and the same. As explained by Whitehorne (1994, p. 182), Cleopatra VI may have actually been a daughter of Ptolemy XII who appeared in 58 BC to rule jointly with her alleged sister Berenice IV (while Ptolemy XII was exiled and living in Rome), whereas Ptolemy XII's wife Cleopatra V perhaps died as early as the winter of 69–68 BC, when she disappears from historical records. Roller (2010, pp. 18–19) assumes that Ptolemy XII's wife, whom he numbers as Cleopatra VI, was merely absent from the court for a decade after being expelled for an unknown reason, eventually ruling jointly with her daughter Berenice IV. Fletcher (2008, p. 76) explains that the Alexandrians deposed Ptolemy XII and installed "his eldest daughter, Berenike IV, and as co-ruler recalled Cleopatra V Tryphaena from 10 years' exile from the court. Although later historians assumed she must have been another of Auletes' daughters and numbered her 'Cleopatra VI', it seems she was simply the fifth one returning to replace her brother and former husband Auletes.")
- Born: Early 69 BC or late 70 BC; Alexandria, Ptolemaic Kingdom
- Died: 10 or 12 August 30 BC (aged 39) (Note: Cleopatra almost certainly died on the 17th day of the Egyptian month Mesore, which corresponds to 10 August in the older Roman calendar, and 12 August in the Julian calendar. See Skeat (1953, pp. 98–100).); Alexandria, Ptolemaic Kingdom
- Burial: Unlocated tomb (probably in Egypt)

Signature (purported)
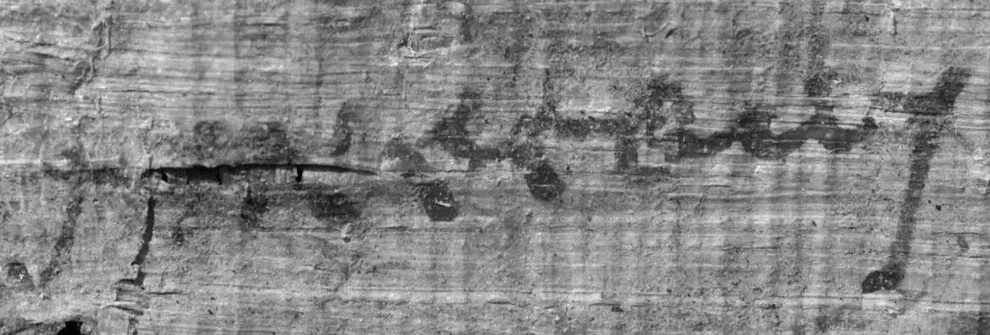
- Dynasty: Ptolemaic dynasty

Cleopatra VII Thea Philopator (Koine Greek: Κλεοπάτρα Θεά Φιλοπάτωρ, lit. 'Cleopatra father-loving goddess'; (Note: The name Cleopatra is pronounced /ˌkliːəˈpætrə/ KLEE-ə-PAT-rə, or sometimes /ˌkliːəˈpɑːtrə/ -PAH-trə in both British and American English, see HarperCollins and Cordry (1998, p. 44) respectively. Her name was pronounced [kleoˈpatra tʰeˈa pʰiloˈpato̞r] in the Greek dialect of Egypt (see Koine Greek phonology). She was also styled as Thea Neotera (Ancient Greek: Θεά Νεωτέρα, lit. 'the younger goddess') and Philopatris (Ancient Greek: Φιλόπατρις, lit. 'loving her country'); see Fischer-Bovet (2015)) 70/69 BC – 10 or 12 August 30 BC) was Queen of the Ptolemaic Kingdom of Egypt from 51 to 30 BC, and the last active Hellenistic pharaoh. (Note: She was also a diplomat, naval commander, and linguist; see Roller (2010, p. 1) and Bradford (2000, p. 13).) A member of the Ptolemaic dynasty, she was a descendant of its founder, Ptolemy I Soter, a Macedonian Greek general and companion of Alexander the Great. (Note: Southern (2009, p. 43) writes about Ptolemy I Soter: "The Ptolemaic dynasty, of which Cleopatra was the last representative, was founded at the end of the fourth century BC. The Ptolemies were not of Egyptian extraction, but stemmed from Ptolemy Soter, a Macedonian Greek in the entourage of Alexander the Great." For additional sources that describe the Ptolemaic dynasty as "Macedonian Greek", please see Roller (2010, pp. 15–16), Jones (2006, pp. xiii, 3, 279), Kleiner (2005, pp. 9, 19, 106, 183), Jeffreys (1999, p. 488) and Johnson (1999, p. 69). Alternatively, Grant (1972, p. 3) describes them as a "Macedonian, Greek-speaking" dynasty. Other sources such as Burstein (2004, p. 64) and Pfrommer & Towne-Markus (2001, p. 9) describe the Ptolemies as "Greco-Macedonian", or rather Macedonians who possessed a Greek culture, as in Pfrommer & Towne-Markus (2001, pp. 9–11, 20).) Cleopatra's first language was Koine Greek, and she is the only Ptolemaic ruler known to have learned the Egyptian language, among several others. (Note: The refusal of Ptolemaic rulers to speak the native language, Demotic Egyptian, is why Koine Greek was used along with Late Egyptian on official court documents such as the Rosetta Stone ("Radio 4 Programmes – A History of the World in 100 Objects, Empire Builders (300 BC – 1 AD), Rosetta Stone". BBC. Archived from the original on 23 May 2010.). As explained by Burstein (2004, pp. 43–54), Ptolemaic Alexandria was considered a polis (city-state) separate from the country of Egypt, with citizenship reserved for Greeks and Ancient Macedonians, but various other ethnic groups resided there, especially the Jews, as well as native Egyptians, Syrians, and Nubians. For further validation, see Grant (1972, p. 3). For the multiple languages spoken by Cleopatra, see Roller (2010, pp. 46–48) and Burstein (2004, pp. 11–12). For further validation about Ancient Greek being the official language of the Ptolemaic dynasty, see Jones (2006, p. 3).) After her death, Egypt became a province of the Roman Empire, marking the end of the Hellenistic period, which had begun with the death of Alexander in 323 BC. (Note: Grant (1972, pp. 5–6) notes that the Hellenistic period, beginning with the reign of Alexander the Great, came to an end with the death of Cleopatra in 30 BC. Michael Grant stresses that the Hellenistic Greeks were viewed by contemporary Romans as having declined and diminished in greatness since the age of Classical Greece, an attitude that has continued even into the works of modern historiography. Regarding Hellenistic Egypt, Grant argues, "Cleopatra VII, looking back upon all that her ancestors had done during that time, was not likely to make the same mistake. But she and her contemporaries of the first century BC had another, peculiar, problem of their own. Could the 'Hellenistic Age' (which we ourselves often regard as coming to an end in about her time) still be said to exist at all, could any Greek age, now that the Romans were the dominant power? This was a question never far from Cleopatra's mind. But it is quite certain that she considered the Greek epoch to be by no means finished, and intended to do everything in her power to ensure its perpetuation.")

Born in Alexandria, Cleopatra was the daughter of Ptolemy XII Auletes, who named her his heir before his death in 51 BC. Cleopatra began her reign alongside her brother Ptolemy XIII, but a falling-out between them led to a civil war. Roman statesman Pompey, their father's former ally, fled to Egypt after losing the 48 BC Battle of Pharsalus against his rival Julius Caesar, the Roman dictator, in Caesar's civil war. Ptolemy XIII had Pompey ambushed and killed before Caesar arrived and occupied Alexandria. Caesar then attempted to reconcile the rival Ptolemaic siblings, but Ptolemy XIII's forces besieged Cleopatra and Caesar at the palace. Shortly after reinforcements lifted the siege, Ptolemy XIII drowned in the Nile. Caesar declared Cleopatra and her brother Ptolemy XIV joint rulers, and maintained a private affair with Cleopatra which produced a son, Caesarion. Cleopatra traveled to Rome as a client queen in 46 and 44 BC, where she stayed at Caesar's villa. After Caesar's assassination and Ptolemy XIV's sudden death (possibly murdered on Cleopatra's order), she named Caesarion co-ruler.

In the Liberators' civil war of 43–42 BC, Cleopatra sided with the Roman Second Triumvirate formed by Caesar's heir Octavian, Mark Antony, and Marcus Aemilius Lepidus. After their meeting at Tarsos in 41 BC, Cleopatra and Antony had an affair which produced three children. Antony became increasingly reliant on Cleopatra for both funding and military aid during his invasions of the Parthian Empire and the Kingdom of Armenia. The Donations of Alexandria declared their children rulers over various territories under Antony's authority. Octavian portrayed this event as an act of treason, forced Antony's allies in the Roman Senate to flee Rome in 32 BC, and declared war on Cleopatra. After defeating Antony and Cleopatra's naval fleet at the 31 BC Battle of Actium, Octavian's forces invaded Egypt in 30 BC and defeated Antony, who committed suicide. After his death, Cleopatra reportedly killed herself, probably by poisoning, to avoid being publicly displayed by Octavian in a Roman triumphal procession.

Cleopatra's legacy survives in ancient and modern works of art. Roman historiography and Latin poetry produced a generally critical view of the queen that pervaded later Medieval and Renaissance literature. In the visual arts, her ancient depictions include Roman busts, paintings, sculptures, cameo carvings and glass, Ptolemaic and Roman coinage, and reliefs. In Renaissance and Baroque art, she was the subject of many works including operas, paintings, poetry, sculptures, and theatrical dramas. She has become a pop culture icon of Egyptomania since the Victorian era, and in modern times has been depicted in the applied and fine arts, burlesque satire, Hollywood films, and brand images for commercial products.

== Etymology ==
The Latinized form Cleopatra comes from the Ancient Greek Kleopátra (Κλεοπάτρα), meaning 'glory of her father', from κλέος (kléos, 'glory') and πατήρ (patḗr, 'father'). The masculine form would have been written either as Kleópatros (Κλεόπατρος) or Pátroklos (Πάτροκλος). Cleopatra was the name of the sister of Alexander the Great and the wife of Meleager in Greek mythology. Through the marriage of Ptolemy V Epiphanes and Cleopatra I Syra (a Seleucid princess), the name entered the Ptolemaic dynasty. Cleopatra's adopted title Theā́ Philopátōra (Θεᾱ́ Φιλοπάτωρα) means 'goddess who loves her father'. (Note: Tyldesley (2017) offers an alternative rendering of the title Cleopatra VII Thea Philopator as "Cleopatra the Father-Loving Goddess".)

== Background ==
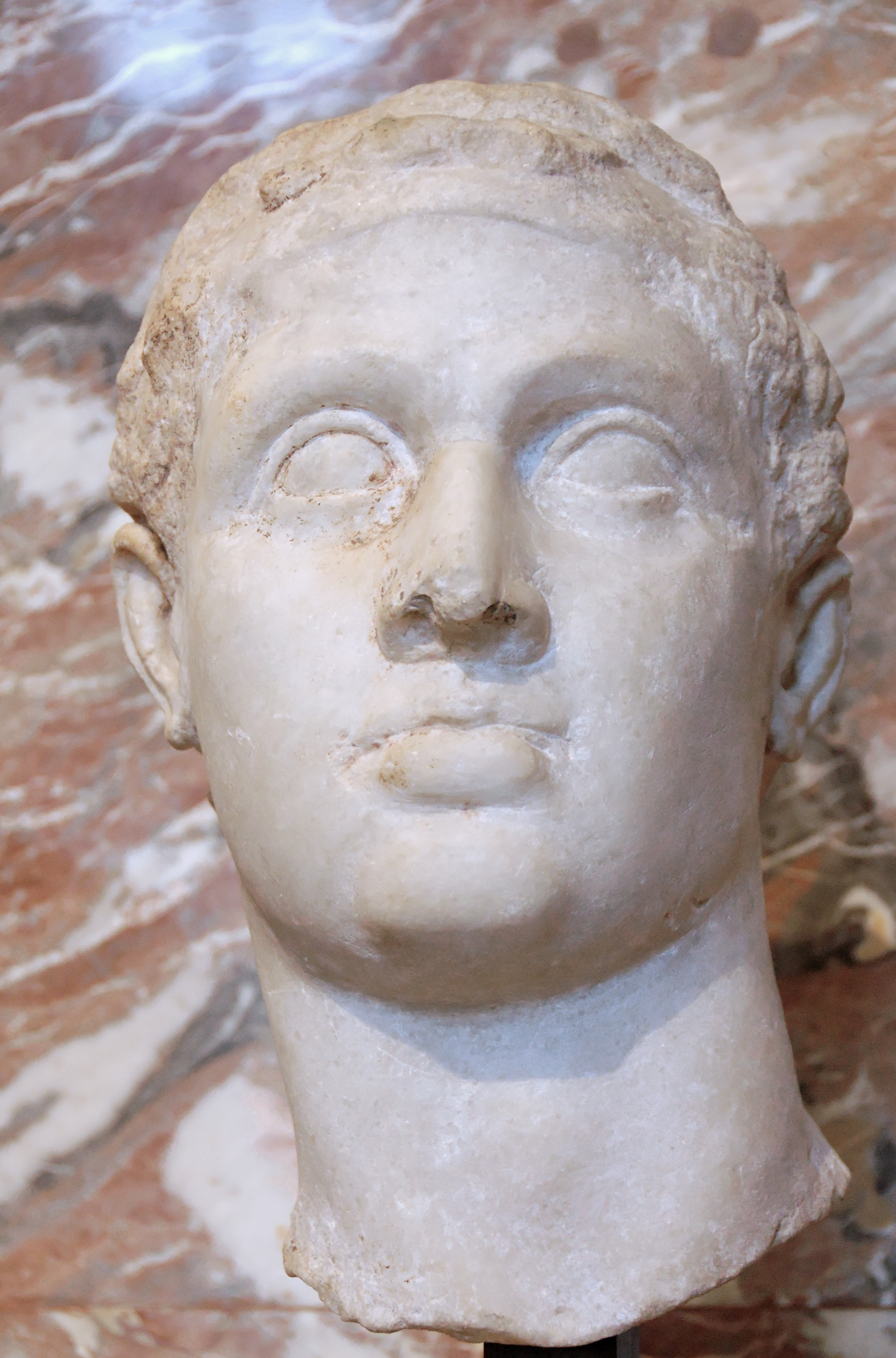
Hellenistic portrait of Ptolemy XII Auletes, the father of Cleopatra, in the Louvre, Paris

Ptolemaic pharaohs were crowned by the Egyptian high priest of Ptah at Memphis, but resided in the multicultural and largely Greek city of Alexandria, established by Alexander the Great. (Note: For a thorough explanation about the foundation of Alexandria by Alexander the Great and its largely Hellenistic Greek nature during the Ptolemaic period, along with a survey of the various ethnic groups residing there, see Burstein (2004, pp. 43–61). For further validation about the founding of Alexandria by Alexander the Great, see Jones (2006, p. 6). For further validation of Ptolemaic rulers being crowned at Memphis, see Jeffreys (1999, p. 488).) They governed Egypt as Hellenistic Greek monarchs and refused to learn the native Egyptian language. In contrast, Cleopatra was the first Ptolemaic ruler known to have learned it and could speak multiple languages by adulthood. (Note: For further information, see Grant (1972, pp. 20, 256, footnote 42).) Plutarch implies that she also spoke Ethiopian, the language of the "Troglodytes", Hebrew (or Aramaic), Arabic, the "Syrian language" (perhaps Syriac), Median, and Parthian, and she could apparently also speak Latin; her Roman contemporaries would have preferred to speak with her in her native Koine Greek. (Note: For the list of languages spoken by Cleopatra as mentioned by the ancient historian Plutarch, see Jones (2006, pp. 33–34), who also mentions that the rulers of Ptolemaic Egypt gradually abandoned the Ancient Macedonian language. For further information and validation see Schiff (2011, p. 36).) Aside from Greek, Egyptian, and Latin, these languages reflected Cleopatra's desire to restore North African and West Asian territories that once belonged to the Ptolemaic Kingdom.

Roman interventionism in Egypt predated the reign of Cleopatra. When her grandfather Ptolemy IX Lathyros died in late 81 BC, he was succeeded by his daughter Berenice III. Some courtiers opposed the new queen as a sole reigning female monarch, so the Roman dictator Sulla arranged her marriage to her stepson, Ptolemy XI Alexander II. Ptolemy XI had his wife killed shortly after their marriage in 80 BC, and a mob lynched him soon after. Ptolemy XI willed the Ptolemaic Kingdom to Rome as collateral for loans, giving the Romans legal grounds to take over Egypt, their client state, after his assassination. The Romans chose instead to divide the Ptolemaic realm among the illegitimate sons of Ptolemy IX, bestowing Egypt on Ptolemy XII Auletes and Cyprus on Ptolemy of Cyprus.

== Biography ==
=== Early childhood ===
Cleopatra VII was born in early 69 BC to Pharaoh Ptolemy XII and an uncertain mother, (Note: Grant (1972, p. 3) states that Cleopatra could have been born in either late 70 BC or early 69 BC.) presumably Ptolemy XII's wife Cleopatra V Tryphaena (who may have been the same person as Cleopatra VI Tryphaena), (Note: For further information and validation see Schiff (2011, p. 28), Kleiner (2005, p. 22), Bennett (1997, pp. 60–63), Bianchi (2005), and Meadows (2001, p. 23). For alternate speculation, see Burstein (2004, p. 11) and Roller (2010, pp. 15, 18, 166). For a comparison of arguments about Cleopatra's maternity, see Prose (2022, p. 38).) the mother of Cleopatra's older sister, Berenice IV Epiphaneia. (Note: Due to discrepancies in academic works, in which some consider Cleopatra VI to be either a daughter of Ptolemy XII or his wife, identical to that of Cleopatra V, Jones (2006, p. 28) states that Ptolemy XII had six children, while Roller (2010, p. 16) mentions only five.) Cleopatra Tryphaena disappears from official records a few months after Cleopatra's birth in 69 BC. The three younger children of Ptolemy XII, Cleopatra's sister Arsinoe IV and brothers Ptolemy XIII Theos Philopator and Ptolemy XIV Philopator, were born in the absence of his wife. Cleopatra's childhood tutor was Philostratos, from whom she learned the Greek arts of oration and philosophy. During her youth Cleopatra presumably studied at the Musaeum, including the Library of Alexandria.

=== Reign and exile of Ptolemy XII ===
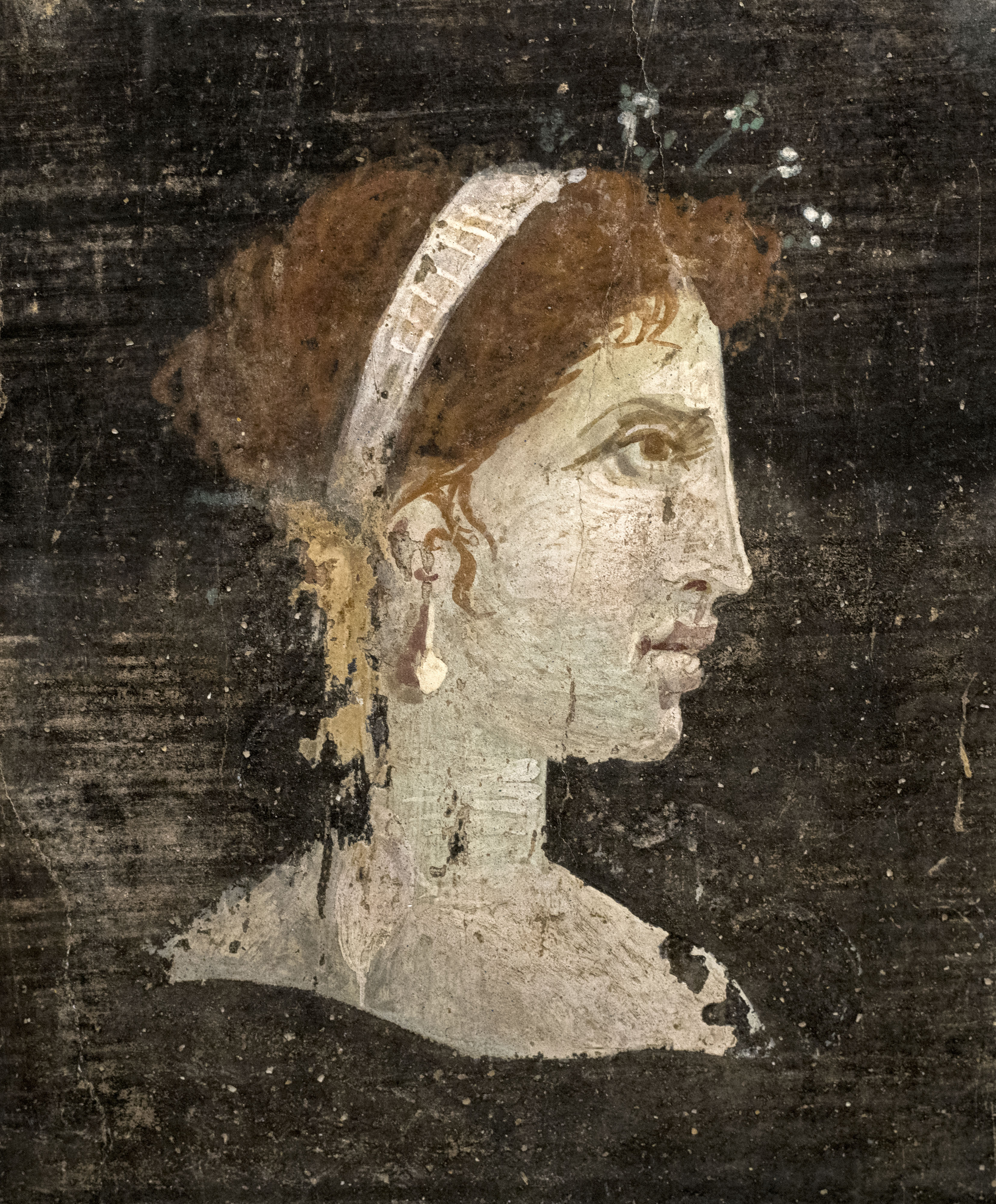
Most likely a posthumously painted portrait of Cleopatra with red hair and her distinct facial features, wearing a royal diadem and pearl-studded hairpins, from Roman Herculaneum, Italy, 1st century AD (Note: Fletcher (2008, p. 87) describes the painting from Herculaneum further: "Cleopatra's hair was maintained by her highly skilled hairdresser Eiras. Although rather artificial looking wigs set in the traditional tripartite style of long straight hair would have been required for her appearances before her Egyptian subjects, a more practical option for general day-to-day wear was the no-nonsense 'melon hairdo' in which her natural hair was drawn back in sections resembling the lines on a melon and then pinned up in a bun at the back of the head. A trademark style of Arsinoe II and Berenice II, the style had fallen from fashion for almost two centuries until revived by Cleopatra; yet as both traditionalist and innovator, she wore her version without her predecessor's fine head veil. And whereas they had both been blonde like Alexander, Cleopatra may well have been a redhead, judging from the portrait of a flame-haired woman wearing the royal diadem surrounded by Egyptian motifs which has been identified as Cleopatra.")

In 65 BC the Roman censor Marcus Licinius Crassus argued that Rome should annex Ptolemaic Egypt, but the Roman Senate rejected his proposed bill and the similar bill of tribune Servilius Rullus in 63 BC. Ptolemy XII responded to the threat of annexation by offering remuneration and lavish gifts to powerful Roman statesmen, such as Pompey during his campaign against Mithridates VI of Pontus and Julius Caesar after he became Roman consul in 59 BC. (Note: For further information and validation, see Grant (1972, pp. 12–13). In 1972, Michael Grant calculated that 6,000 talents, the price of Ptolemy XII's fee for receiving the title "friend and ally of the Roman people" from the triumvirs Pompey and Julius Caesar, would be worth roughly £7 million or US$17 million, roughly the entire annual tax revenue for Ptolemaic Egypt.) Ptolemy XII's profligate behavior bankrupted him, and he was forced to acquire loans from the Roman banker Gaius Rabirius Postumus.

In 58 BC the Romans annexed Cyprus and on accusations of piracy drove Ptolemy of Cyprus, Ptolemy XII's brother, to commit suicide instead of enduring exile to Paphos. (Note: For political background information on the Roman annexation, a move pushed for in the Roman Senate by Publius Clodius Pulcher, see Grant (1972, pp. 13–14).) Ptolemy XII remained publicly silent on his brother's death, damaging his credibility among subjects already enraged by his economic policies. He was then exiled from Egypt, traveling first to Rhodes, then Athens, and finally the villa of triumvir Pompey in the Alban Hills, near Praeneste, Italy. (Note: For further information, see Grant (1972, pp. 15–16).)

Ptolemy XII spent up to a year there on the outskirts of Rome, ostensibly accompanied by his daughter Cleopatra, then about 11. (Note: Fletcher (2008, pp. 76–77) expresses little doubt about this: "deposed in late summer 58 BC and fearing for his life, Auletes had fled both his palace and his kingdom, although he was not completely alone. For one Greek source reveals he had been accompanied 'by one of his daughters', and since his eldest Berenice IV, was monarch, and the youngest, Arsinoe, little more than a toddler, it is generally assumed that this must have been his middle daughter and favourite child, eleven-year-old Cleopatra.") Berenice IV sent an embassy to Rome to advocate for her rule and oppose her father's reinstatement. Ptolemy had assassins kill the leaders of the embassy, an incident that his powerful Roman supporters suppressed. (Note: For further information, see Grant (1972, p. 16).) When the Roman Senate denied Ptolemy XII the offer of an armed escort and provisions for a return to Egypt, he decided to leave Rome in late 57 BC and reside at the Temple of Artemis in Ephesus.

Ptolemy XII's Roman financiers remained determined to restore him to power. By offering 10,000 talents to Aulus Gabinius, the Roman governor of Syria, Pompey persuaded him to invade Egypt and restore Ptolemy XII. Gabinius invaded Egypt in the spring of 55 BC by way of Hasmonean Judea, where Hyrcanus II had Antipater the Idumaean furnish the Roman-led army with supplies. As a young cavalry officer, Mark Antony was under Gabinius's command. He distinguished himself by preventing Ptolemy XII from massacring the inhabitants of Pelousion and for rescuing the body of Berenice's husband, Archelaos, after he was killed in battle, ensuring him a proper royal burial. The 14-year-old Cleopatra would have traveled with the Roman expedition into Egypt; years later, Antony would profess that he had fallen in love with her at this time.

The Roman Republic (green) and Ptolemaic Egypt (yellow) in 40 BC

Gabinius was put on trial in Rome for abusing his authority, for which he was acquitted. A second trial for bribery led to his exile. Caesar recalled him from exile seven years later, in 48 BC. Crassus replaced Gabinius as governor of Syria and extended his provincial command to Egypt, but was killed by the Parthians at the Battle of Carrhae in 53 BC. Ptolemy XII executed Berenice and her wealthy supporters, seizing their properties. He allowed Gabinius's largely Germanic and Gallic Roman garrison, the Gabiniani, to harass people in the streets of Alexandria and installed his longtime Roman financier Rabirius as his chief financial officer. (Note: For further information on Roman financier Rabirius, as well as the Gabiniani left in Egypt by Gabinius, see Grant (1972, pp. 18–19).)

Within a year, Rabirius was placed under protective custody and sent back to Rome after his life was endangered for draining Egypt of its resources. (Note: For further information, see Grant (1972, p. 18).) Despite these problems, Ptolemy XII created a will designating Cleopatra and Ptolemy XIII as his joint heirs, oversaw major construction projects such as the Temple of Edfu and a temple at Dendera, and stabilized the economy. (Note: For further information, see Grant (1972, pp. 19–20, 27–29).) On 31 May 52 BC, Ptolemy XII made Cleopatra his regent, as indicated by an inscription in the Temple of Hathor at Dendera. (Note: Papyri of 51 BC were dated as the "thirtieth year of Auletes which is the first year of Cleopatra". See Grant (1972, pp. 28–30).) Before his death, Ptolemy XII had not paid Rabirius all his debt, which Cleopatra and Ptolemy XIII thus inherited. The new pharaohs owed the Roman Republic 17.5 million drachmas.

=== Reign ===
==== Accession to the throne ====
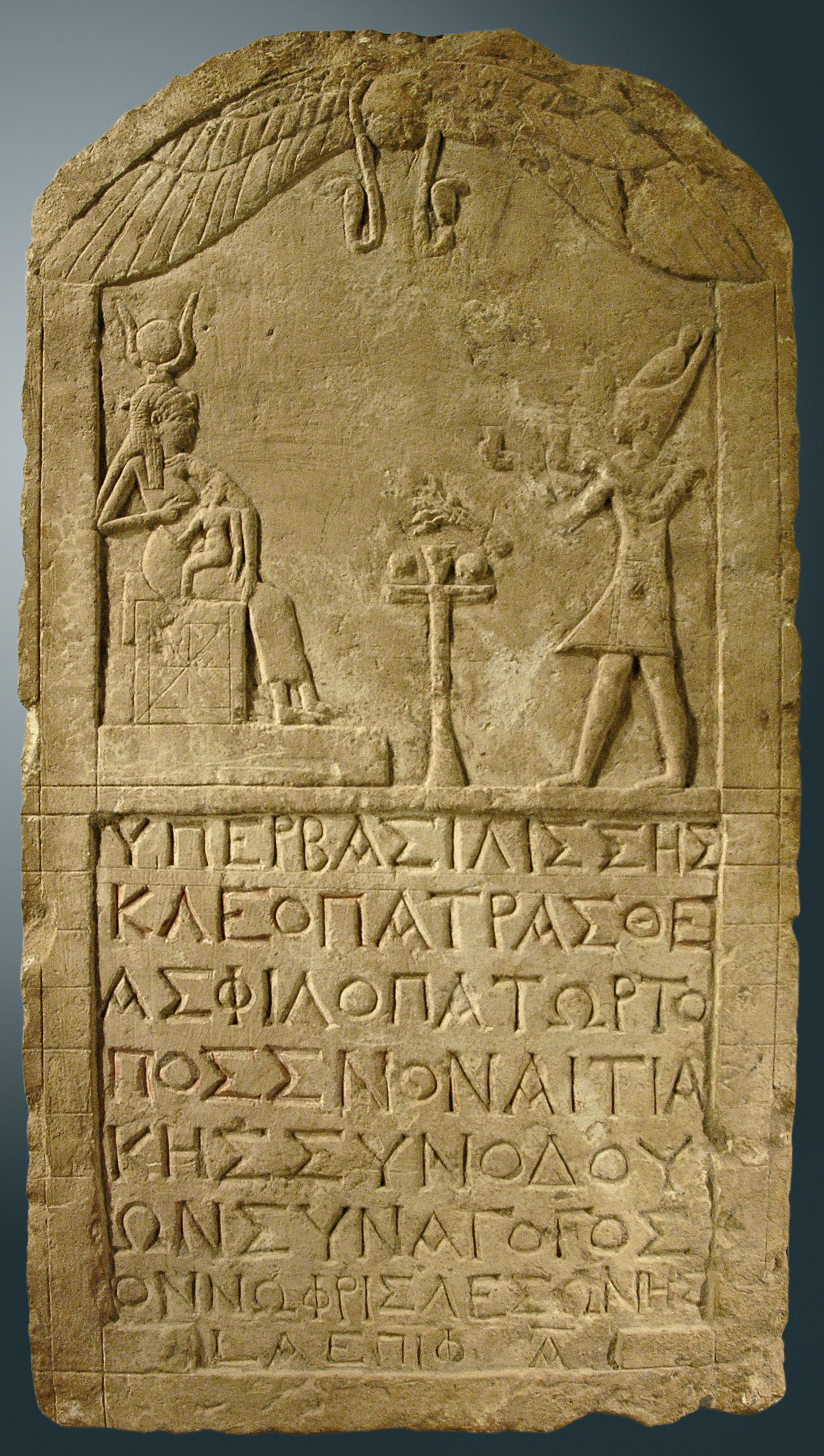
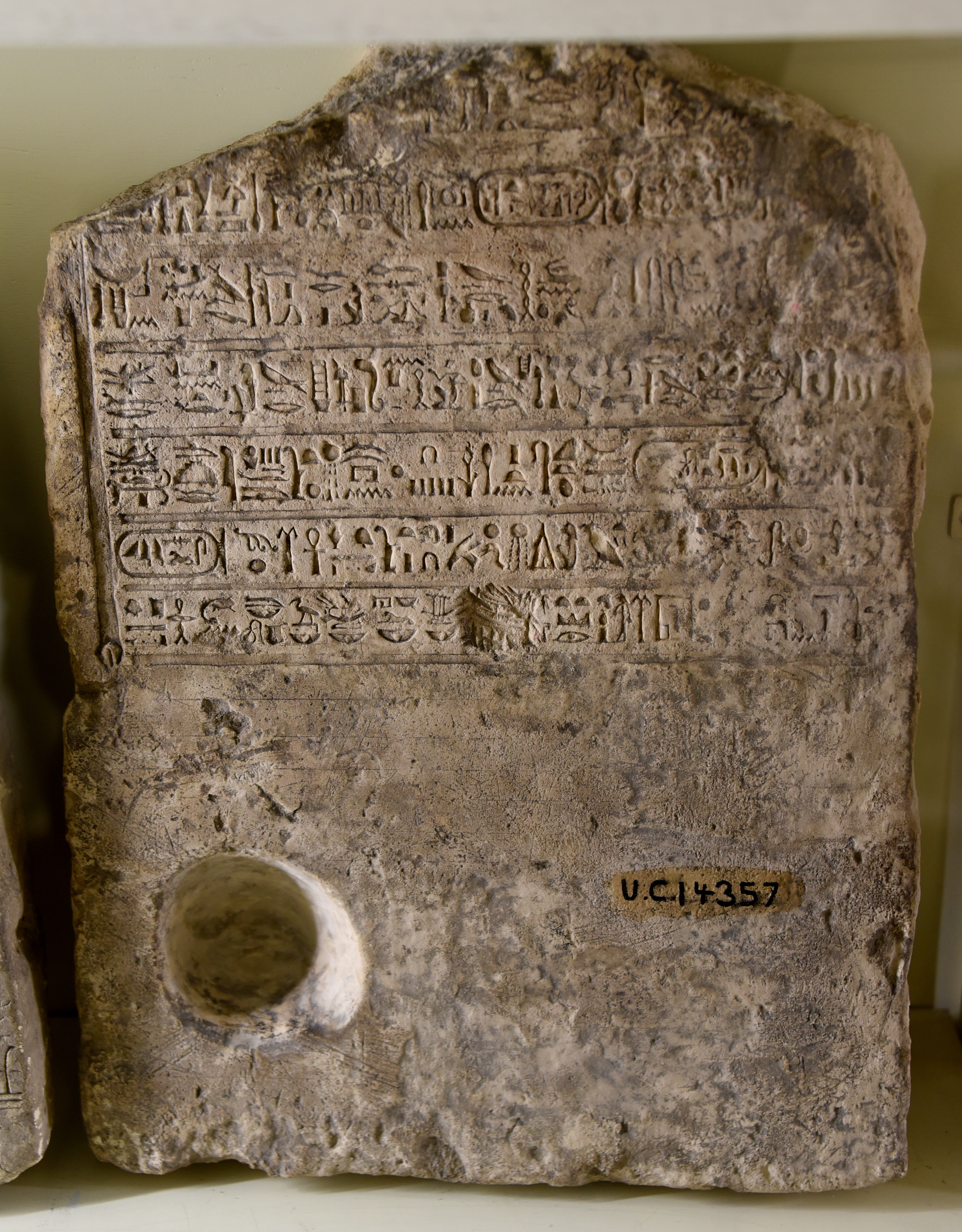
Left: A limestone stele dedicated by a Greek man named Onnophris depicting a male pharaoh, but honouring a queen Cleopatra (probably Cleopatra VII), located in the Louvre, Paris (Note: It is disputed whether Cleopatra was deliberately depicted as a male or whether a stele made under her father with his portrait was later inscribed with an inscription for Cleopatra. On this and other uncertainties regarding this stele, see Pfeiffer (2015, pp. 177–181).)
Right: The cartouches of Cleopatra and Caesarion on a limestone stele of High Priest Pasherienptah III in Egypt, dated to the Ptolemaic period, and located in the Petrie Museum of Egyptian Archaeology, London

Ptolemy XII died some time before 22 March 51 BC, when Cleopatra, in her first act as queen, began her voyage to Hermonthis, near Thebes, to install a new sacred Buchis bull, worshiped as an intermediary for the god Montu in the Ancient Egyptian religion. (Note: For further information, see Fletcher (2008, pp. 88–92) and Jones (2006, pp. 31, 34–35). Fletcher (2008, pp. 85–86) states that the partial solar eclipse of 7 March 51 BC marked the death of Ptolemy XII and accession of Cleopatra to the throne, although she apparently suppressed the news of his death, alerting the Roman Senate to this fact months later in a message they received on 30 June 51 BC. However, Grant (1972, p. 30) claims that the Senate was informed of his death on 1 August 51 BC. Michael Grant indicates that Ptolemy XII could have been alive as late as May, while an ancient Egyptian source affirms he was still ruling with Cleopatra by 15 July 51 BC, although by this point Cleopatra most likely "hushed up her father's death" so that she could consolidate her control of Egypt.) Cleopatra faced several pressing issues and emergencies shortly after taking the throne. These included famine caused by drought and a low level of the annual flooding of the Nile, and lawless behavior instigated by the Gabiniani, the now unemployed and assimilated Roman soldiers of Aulus Gabinius.

In 50 BC, Marcus Calpurnius Bibulus, proconsul of Syria, sent his two eldest sons to Egypt, most likely to negotiate with the Gabiniani and recruit them as soldiers in the desperate defense of Syria against the Parthians; the Gabiniani tortured and murdered his sons. Cleopatra sent the culprits to Bibulus as prisoners awaiting his judgment, but he sent them back to Cleopatra and chastised her for interfering in their adjudication, which was the prerogative of the Roman Senate. Bibulus, siding with Pompey in Caesar's Civil War, failed to prevent Caesar from landing a naval fleet in Greece, allowing Caesar to reach Egypt in pursuit of Pompey.

By 29 August 51 BC, official documents started listing Cleopatra as the sole ruler, evidence that she had rejected her brother Ptolemy XIII as a co-ruler. She had probably married him, but there is no record of this. Ptolemy II and his sister Arsinoe II had introduced the Ptolemaic practice of sibling marriage, a long-held royal Egyptian practice loathed by contemporary Greeks. (Note: Pfrommer & Towne-Markus (2001, p. 34) writes the following about the sibling marriage of Ptolemy II and Arsinoe II: "Ptolemy Keraunos, who wanted to become king of Macedon ... killed Arsinoë's small children in front of her. Now queen without a kingdom, Arsinoë fled to Egypt, where she was welcomed by her full brother Ptolemy II. Not content, however, to spend the rest of her life as a guest at the Ptolemaic court, she had Ptolemy II's wife exiled to Upper Egypt and married him herself around 275 B.C. Though such an incestuous marriage was considered scandalous by the Greeks, it was allowed by Egyptian custom. For that reason, the marriage split public opinion into two factions. The loyal side celebrated the couple as a return of the divine marriage of Zeus and Hera, whereas the other side did not refrain from profuse and obscene criticism. One of the most sarcastic commentators, a poet with a very sharp pen, had to flee Alexandria. The unfortunate poet was caught off the shore of Crete by the Ptolemaic navy, put in an iron basket, and drowned. This and similar actions seemingly slowed down vicious criticism.") By Cleopatra's reign, sibling marriage was considered a normal arrangement for Ptolemaic rulers.

Ptolemy XIII still retained powerful allies, notably the eunuch Potheinos, his childhood tutor, regent, and administrator of his properties. Others involved in the cabal against Cleopatra included Ptolemy XIII's other tutor, Theodotus of Chios, and the military commander Achillas. Cleopatra seems to have attempted a short-lived alliance with her brother Ptolemy XIV, but by the autumn of 50 BC Ptolemy XIII had the upper hand in their conflict and began signing documents with his name before that of Cleopatra, followed by the establishment of his first regnal date in 49 BC. (Note: For further information, see Fletcher (2008, pp. 92–93).)

==== Assassination of Pompey ====
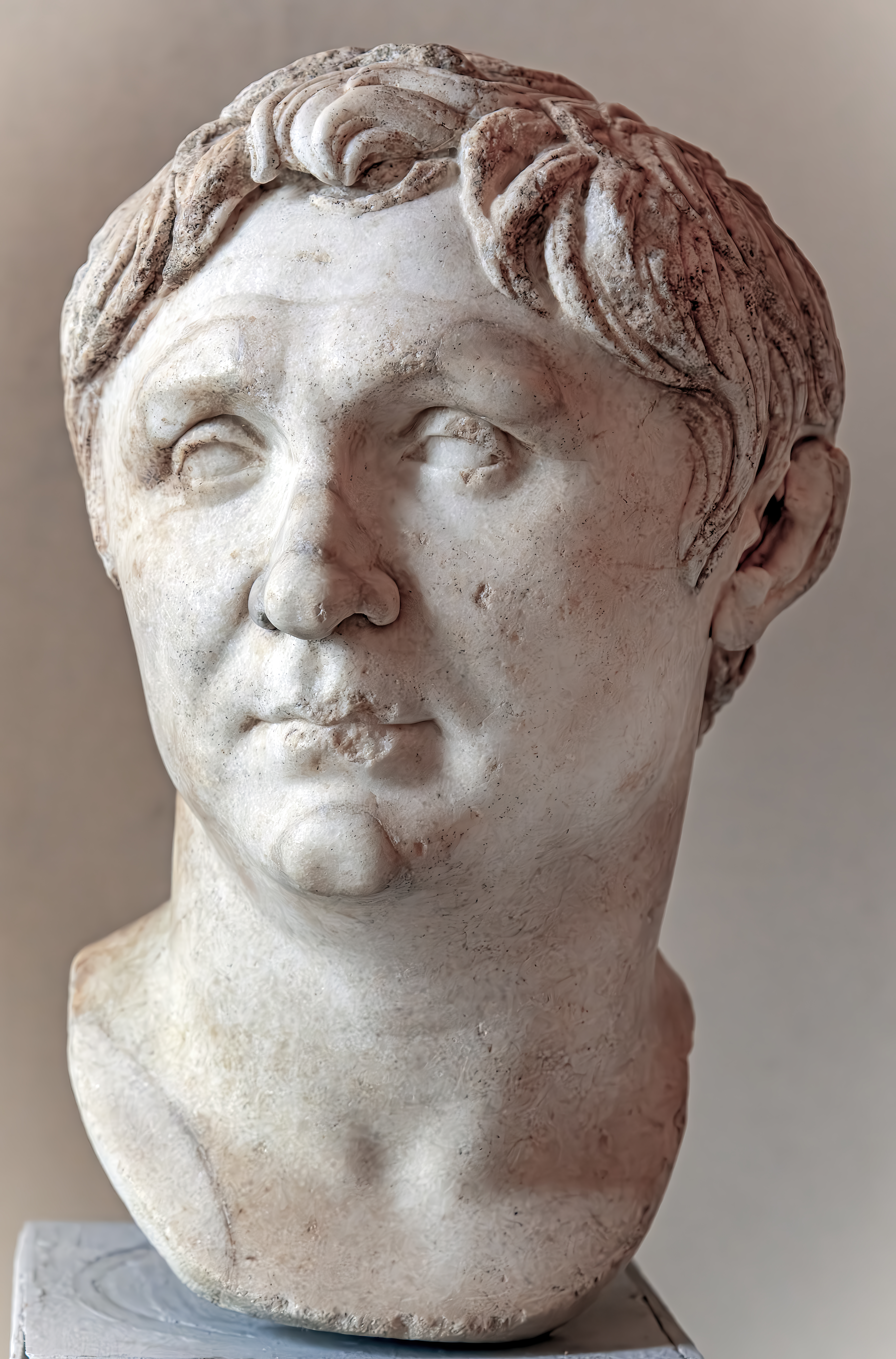
A Roman portrait of Pompey made during the reign of Augustus (27 BC – 14 AD), a copy of an original from 70 to 60 BC, and located in the Venice National Archaeological Museum, Italy

In the summer of 49 BC, Cleopatra and her forces were still fighting against Ptolemy XIII within Alexandria when Pompey's son Gnaeus Pompeius arrived, seeking military aid on behalf of his father. After returning to Italy upon his conquest of Gaul and crossing the Rubicon in January of 49 BC, Caesar had forced Pompey and his supporters to flee to Greece. In perhaps their last joint decree, both Cleopatra and Ptolemy XIII agreed to Gnaeus Pompeius's request and sent his father 60 ships and 500 troops, including the Gabiniani, a move that helped erase some of the debt owed to Rome. Losing the fight against her brother, Cleopatra was then forced to flee Alexandria and withdraw to the region of Thebes. By the spring of 48 BC she had traveled to Roman Syria with her younger sister, Arsinoe IV, to gather an invasion force that would head to Egypt. She returned with an army, but her brother's forces blocked her advance to Alexandria, so she camped outside Pelousion in the eastern Nile Delta.

In Greece, Caesar and Pompey's forces engaged each other at the Battle of Pharsalus on 9 August 48 BC, leading to the destruction of most of Pompey's army and his forced flight to Tyre, Lebanon. (Note: For further information, see Fletcher (2008, pp. 96–97) and Jones (2006, p. 39).) Given his close relationship with the Ptolemies, Pompey decided to take refuge in Egypt and replenish his forces there. (Note: For further information, see Jones (2006, pp. 39–41).) Ptolemy XIII's advisers feared Pompey would use Egypt as his base in a protracted Roman civil war. In a scheme devised by Theodotus, Pompey arrived by ship near Pelousion after being invited by a written message, only to be ambushed and stabbed to death on 28 September 48 BC. (Note: For further information, see Fletcher (2008, p. 98) and Jones (2006, pp. 39–43, 53–55).) Ptolemy XIII believed he had both demonstrated his power and defused the situation by having Pompey's severed head sent to Caesar, who arrived in Alexandria by early October and took up residence at the royal palace. Caesar expressed grief and outrage over the killing and called on both Ptolemy XIII and Cleopatra to disband their forces and reconcile with each other. (Note: For further information, see Fletcher (2008, pp. 98–100) and Jones (2006, pp. 53–55).)

==== Relationship with Julius Caesar ====
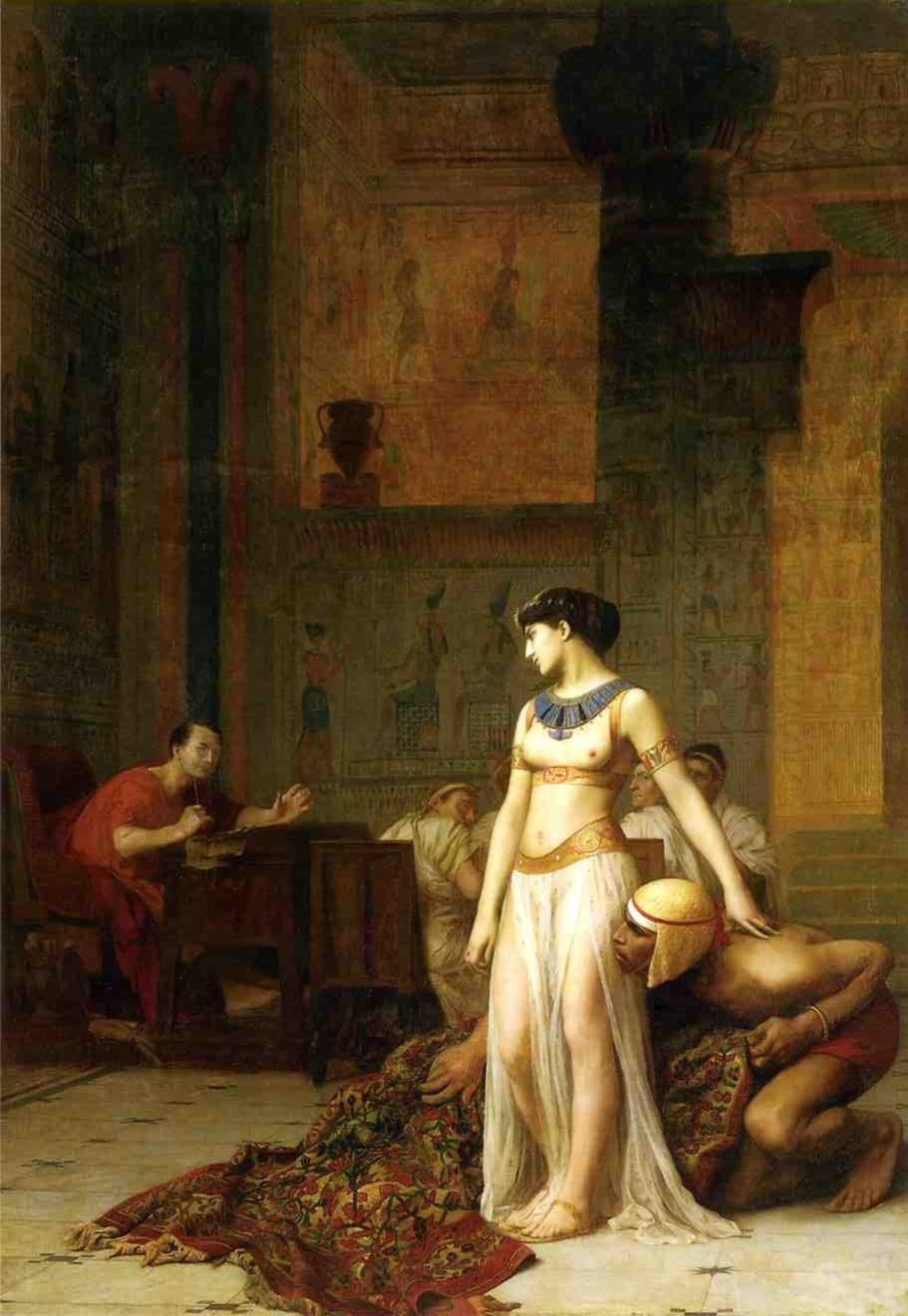
Cleopatra and Caesar (1866), a painting by Jean-Léon Gérôme

Ptolemy XIII arrived at Alexandria at the head of his army, in clear defiance of Caesar's demand. Cleopatra initially sent emissaries to Caesar, but upon allegedly hearing that Caesar was inclined to having affairs with royal women, she came to Alexandria to see him personally. Historian Cassius Dio records that she did so without informing her brother, dressed in an attractive manner, and charmed Caesar with her wit. Plutarch provides an entirely different account that alleges she was bound inside a bed sack to be smuggled into the palace to meet Caesar. (Note: For further information, see Burstein (2004, p. 18) and Fletcher (2008, pp. 101–103).)

When Ptolemy XIII realized that his sister was in the palace consorting directly with Caesar, he attempted to rouse the Alexandrian populace into a riot, but Caesar arrested him and used his oratorical skills to calm the frenzied crowd. Caesar brought the siblings before the assembly of Alexandria, where he revealed their father's written will naming the two siblings as his joint heirs. (Note: For further information, see Fletcher (2008, p. 113).) Caesar attempted to arrange for the other two siblings, Arsinoe IV and Ptolemy XIV, to rule together over Cyprus, thus removing potential rival claimants to the Egyptian throne and appeasing bitter Ptolemaic subjects.

Judging that this agreement favored Cleopatra over Ptolemy XIII and that the latter's army of 20,000 could most likely defeat Caesar's army of 4,000 unsupported troops, Ptolemy XIII's regent Potheinos decided to have the commander Achillas lead their forces to Alexandria to attack Caesar and Cleopatra; (Note: For further information, see Fletcher (2008, p. 118).) Caesar managed to execute Potheinos. Arsinoe allied with Achillas and was declared queen, but soon afterward had her tutor Ganymedes kill Achillas and take his position as commander of her army. (Note: For further information, see Burstein (2004, p. 76).) Ganymedes tricked Caesar into requesting the presence of the captive Ptolemy XIII as a negotiator, only to have him join Arsinoe's army. The resulting siege of the palace, with Caesar and Cleopatra trapped together inside, lasted into the following year of 47 BC. (Note: For further information, see Burstein (2004, pp. xxi, 19) and Fletcher (2008, pp. 118–120).)

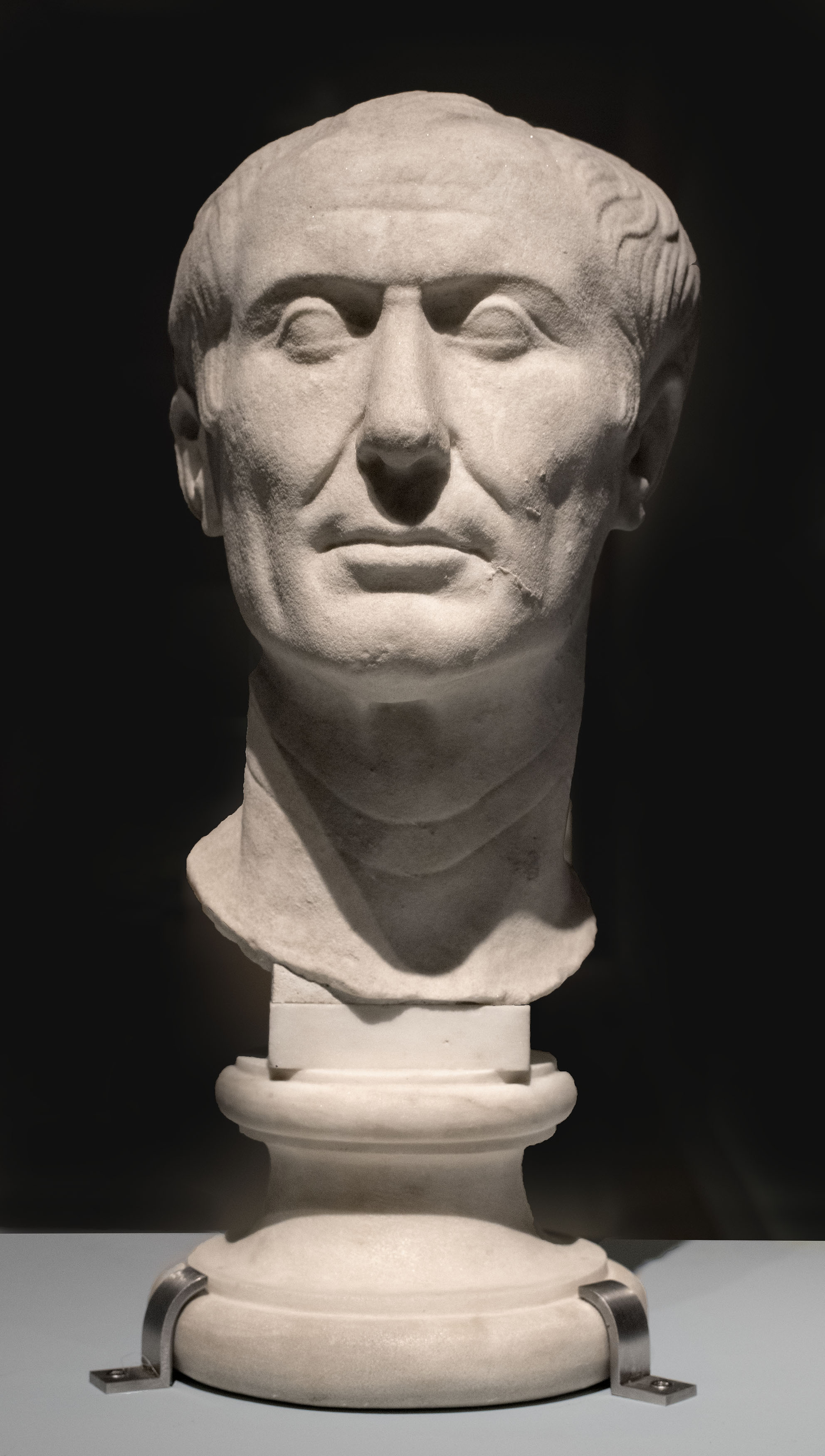
The Tusculum portrait, a contemporary Roman sculpture of Julius Caesar located in the Archaeological Museum of Turin, Italy

In early 47 BC, Caesar's reinforcements arrived, including those led by Mithridates of Pergamon and Antipater the Idumaean. (Note: For further information, see Fletcher (2008, pp. 119–120). As part of the siege of Alexandria, Burstein (2004, p. 19) states that Caesar's reinforcements came in January, but Roller (2010, p. 63) says that his reinforcements came in March.) Ptolemy XIII and Arsinoe IV withdrew their forces to the Nile, where Caesar attacked them. Ptolemy XIII drowned while trying to flee by boat. (Note: For further information and validation, see Anderson (2003, p. 39) and Fletcher (2008, p. 120).) His tutor Theodotus escaped, while Ganymedes may have been killed in the battle. Caesar paraded Arsinoe in his triumph in Rome before exiling her to the Temple of Artemis at Ephesus. Cleopatra, pregnant with Caesar's child, was absent from these events and resided in the palace.

Caesar's term as consul had expired at the end of 48 BC. Caesar's officer Antony helped to secure his appointment as dictator for a year, until October 47 BC, providing Caesar with the legal authority to settle the dynastic dispute in Egypt. Caesar appointed the 12-year-old Ptolemy XIV as joint ruler with the 22-year-old Cleopatra in a nominal sibling marriage, but Cleopatra continued living privately with Caesar. (Note: For further information and validation, see Fletcher (2008, p. 121) and Jones (2006, p. xiv). Roller (2010, pp. 64–65) states that at this point (47 BC) Ptolemy XIV was 12 years old, while Burstein (2004, p. 19) claims that he was still only 10 years of age.) The exact date at which Cyprus was returned to her control is not known, although she had a governor there by 42 BC.

Caesar is alleged to have joined Cleopatra for a cruise of the Nile and sightseeing of Egyptian monuments. The historian Suetonius provided considerable details about the voyage, including use of Thalamegos, the pleasure barge constructed by Ptolemy IV, which during his reign measured 90 meters (300 ft) in length and 24 meters (80 ft) in height and contained dining rooms, state rooms, holy shrines, and promenades along its two decks, resembling a floating villa. Caesar may have been interested in the cruise because of his fascination with geography; he was well-read in the works of Eratosthenes and Pytheas, and perhaps wanted to discover the source of the river, but turned back before reaching Ethiopia.

Caesar departed from Egypt around April 47 BC, allegedly to confront Pharnaces II of Pontus, who was causing trouble for Rome in Anatolia. Caesar, a married man, also may have wanted to avoid being seen together with Cleopatra when she had their son. He left three legions in Egypt, later increased to four, under the command of the freedman Rufio, to secure Cleopatra's tenuous position, but also perhaps to keep her activities in check.

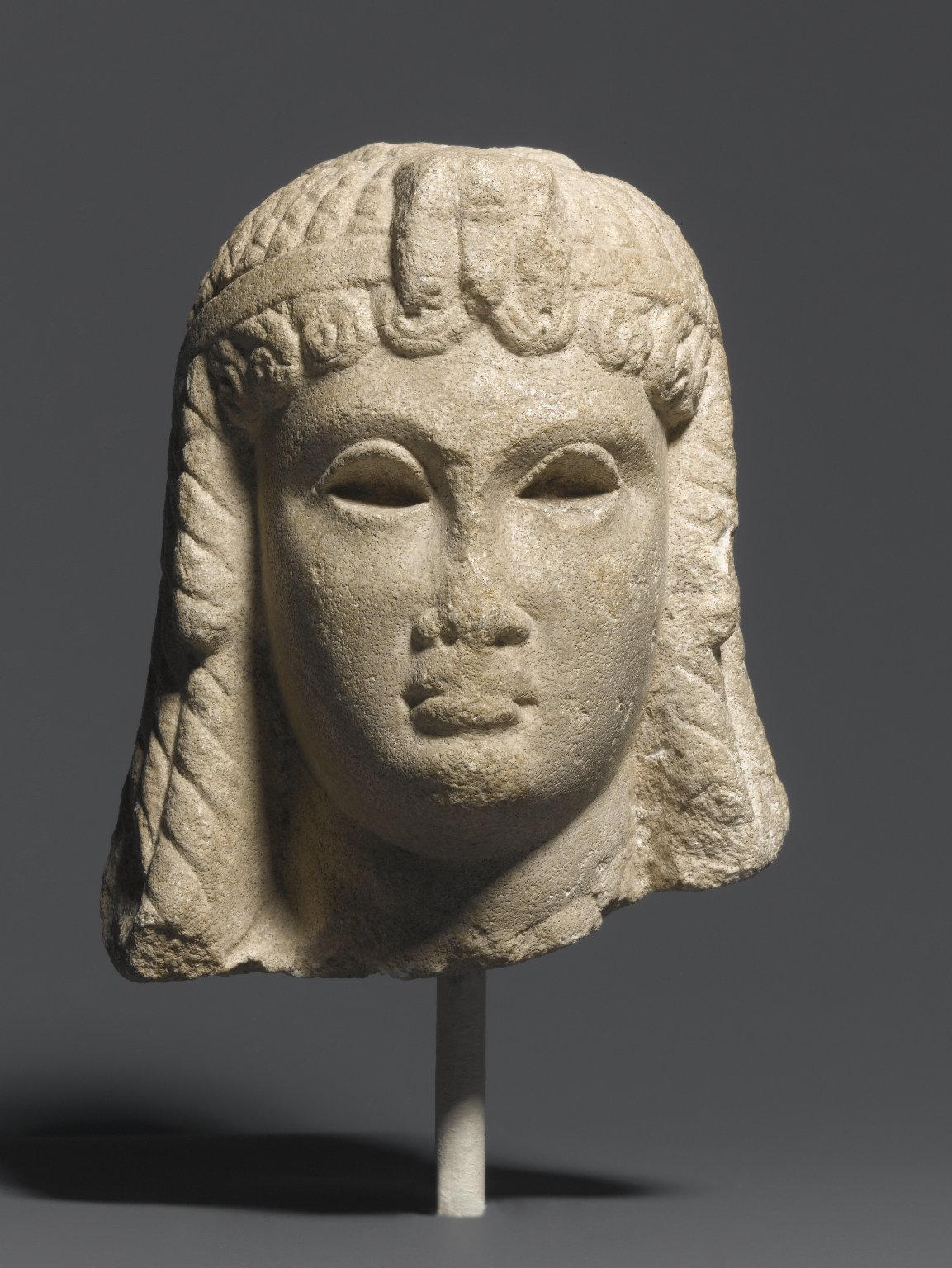
An Egyptian portrait of a Ptolemaic queen, possibly Cleopatra, c. 51–30 BC, located in the Brooklyn Museum

Cleopatra gave birth to Caesarion, her alleged child with Caesar, some time in 47, possibly on 23 June 47 BC if stele at the Serapeum of Saqqara that mentions "King Caesar" refers to him. (Note: For further information and validation, see Anderson (2003, p. 39) and Fletcher (2008, pp. 154, 161–162); for date being disputed, see Tyldesley (2009, pp. 136–137).) Perhaps owing to his still childless marriage, Caesar remained publicly silent about Caesarion (but perhaps accepted his parentage in private). (Note: Roller (2010, p. 70) writes the following about Caesar and his parentage of Caesarion: "The matter of parentage became so tangled in the propaganda war between Antonius and Octavian in the late 30s B.C.—it was essential for one side to prove and the other to reject Caesar's role—that it is impossible today to determine Caesar's actual response. The extant information is almost contradictory: it was said that Caesar denied parentage in his will but acknowledged it privately and allowed the use of the name Caesarion. Caesar's associate C. Oppius even wrote a pamphlet proving that Caesarion was not Caesar's child, and C. Helvius Cinna—the poet who was killed by rioters after Antonius' funeral oration—was prepared in 44 B.C. to introduce legislation to allow Caesar to marry as many wives as he wished for the purpose of having children. Although much of this talk was generated after Caesar's death, it seems that he wished to be as quiet as possible about the child but had to contend with Cleopatra's repeated assertions.") Cleopatra, on the other hand, repeatedly declared Caesar as the father.

Cleopatra and Ptolemy XIV visited Rome some time in late 46 BC, presumably without Caesarion, and received lodging in Caesar's villa within the Horti Caesaris. (Note: For further information and validation, see Jones (2006, pp. xiv, 78).) As with their father, Caesar awarded both pharaohs the legal status of "friend and ally of the Roman people" (Latin: socius et amicus populi Romani), in effect client rulers loyal to Rome. Cleopatra's visitors at Caesar's villa across the Tiber included the senator Cicero, who found her arrogant. Sosigenes of Alexandria, one of the members of Cleopatra's court, aided Caesar in the calculations for the new Julian calendar, put into effect 1 January 45 BC. The Temple of Venus Genetrix, established in the Forum of Caesar on 25 September 46 BC, contained a golden statue of Cleopatra (which stood there at least until the 3rd century AD), associating the mother of Caesar's child directly with the goddess Venus, mother of the Romans. The statue also subtly linked the Egyptian goddess Isis with the Roman religion.

Cleopatra's presence in Rome likely affected the events at the Lupercalia festival a month before Caesar's assassination. Antony attempted to place a royal diadem on Caesar's head, but Caesar refused in what was most likely a staged performance. Cicero, who was present at the festival, mockingly asked where the diadem came from, an obvious reference to the Ptolemaic queen whom he abhorred. Caesar was assassinated on the Ides of March (15 March 44 BC), but Cleopatra stayed in Rome until about mid-April, in the vain hope of having Caesarion recognized as Caesar's heir. However, Caesar's grandnephew Octavian, whom his will named as the primary heir, arrived in Italy around the same time Cleopatra decided to depart for Egypt. It is suggested that Cleopatra might have been pregnant at that time with her and Caesar's second child; if so, she miscarried the baby. A few months later, Ptolemy XIV died—allegedly poisoned by Cleopatra—and she elevated her son Caesarion as her co-ruler. (Note: For further information, see Fletcher (2008, pp. 214–215).)

==== Liberators' civil war ====
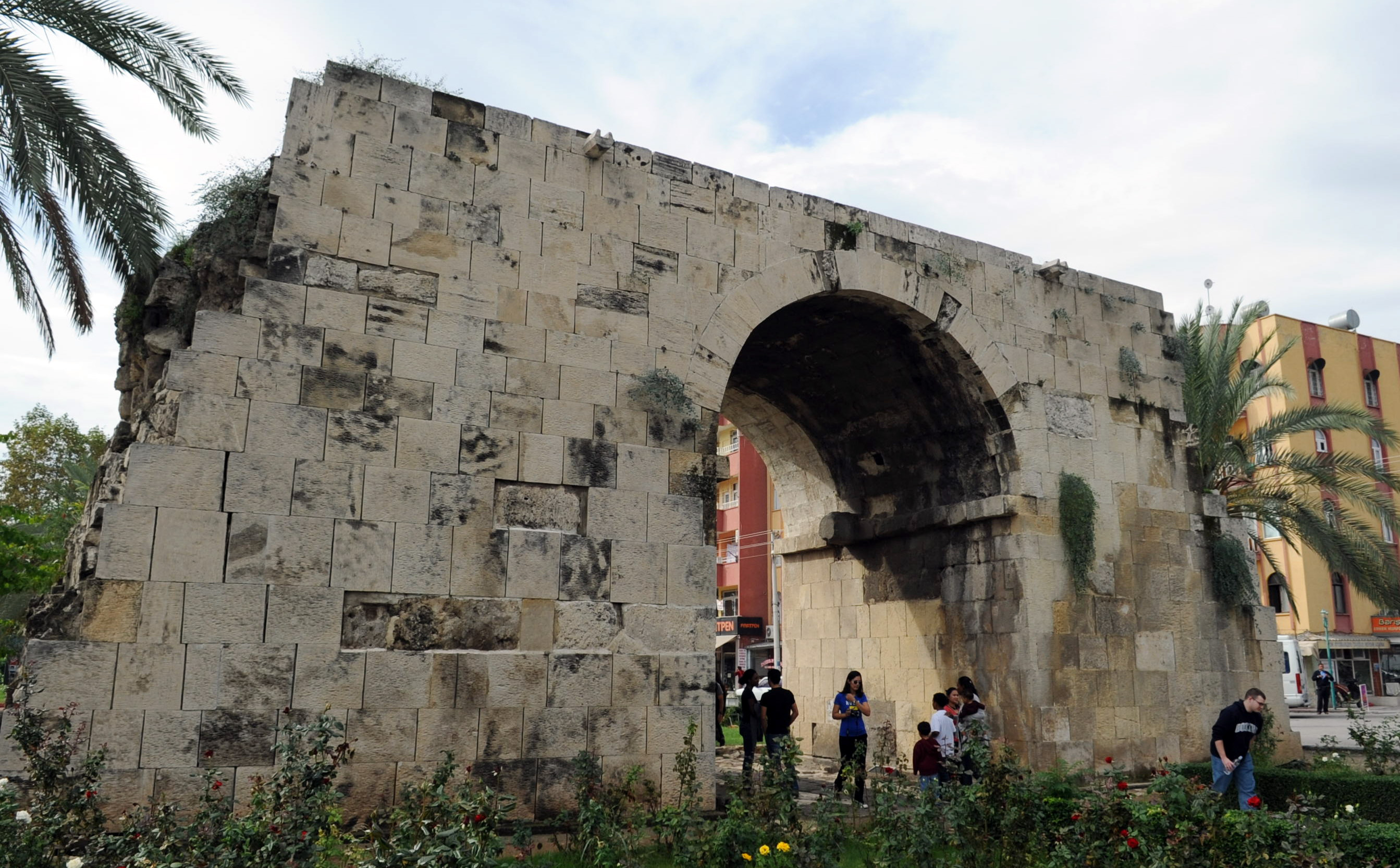
Cleopatra's Gate in Tarsos (now Tarsus, Mersin, Turkey), the site where she met Mark Antony in 41 BC

Octavian, Antony, and Marcus Aemilius Lepidus formed the Second Triumvirate in 43 BC, in which they were each elected for five-year terms to restore order in the Republic and bring Caesar's assassins to justice. Cleopatra received messages requesting military aid from both Caesar's assassin Gaius Cassius Longinus and the Syrian governor Publius Cornelius Dolabella, a Caesarian loyalist. She decided to write Cassius an excuse that her kingdom faced too many internal problems, while sending the four legions left by Caesar in Egypt to Dolabella. Cassius captured these troops in Palestine.

While Serapion, Cleopatra's governor of Cyprus, defected to Cassius and provided him with ships, Cleopatra took her own fleet to Greece to personally assist Octavian and Antony. Her ships were heavily damaged in a storm, and she arrived too late to help. By the autumn of 42 BC, Antony had defeated the forces of Caesar's assassins at the Battle of Philippi in Greece, leading to the suicides of assassins Cassius and Brutus.

By the end of 42 BC, Octavian had gained control over much of the western half of the Roman Republic and Antony the eastern half, with Lepidus largely marginalized. In the summer of 41 BC, Antony established his headquarters at Tarsos in Anatolia and summoned Cleopatra there in several letters, which she rebuffed until Antony's envoy Quintus Dellius convinced her to come. The meeting would allow Cleopatra to clear up the misconception that she had supported Cassius during the civil war and address territorial exchanges in the Levant, but Antony also desired to form a personal, romantic relationship with her. Cleopatra sailed up the Kydnos River to Tarsos in Thalamegos, hosting Antony and his officers for two nights of lavish banquets on board the ship. (Note: As explained by Burstein (2004, p. 23), Cleopatra boldly presented herself to Antony as the Egyptian goddess Isis (in the appearance of the Greek goddess Aphrodite) meeting her divine husband Osiris (in the form of the Greek god Dionysus), knowing that the priests of the Temple of Artemis at Ephesus had associated Antony with Dionysus shortly before this encounter. According to Brown (2011), a cult surrounding Isis had been spreading across the region for hundreds of years, and Cleopatra, like many of her predecessors, sought to identify herself with Isis and be venerated. In addition, some surviving coins of Cleopatra also depict her as Venus–Aphrodite, as explained by Fletcher (2008, p. 205).) Cleopatra managed to clear her name as a supposed supporter of Cassius, arguing she had really attempted to help Dolabella in Syria, and convinced Antony to execute her sister Arsinoe at Ephesus. He also handed the rebellious Serapion over to Cleopatra for execution.

==== Relationship with Mark Antony ====
Denarius depicting Mark Antony minted by Marcus Barbatius

Cleopatra invited Antony to come to Egypt before departing from Tarsos, which led Antony to visit Alexandria by November 41 BC. The populace of Alexandria received him well, both for his heroic actions in restoring Ptolemy XII to power and coming to Egypt without an occupation force like Caesar had done. In Egypt, Antony continued to enjoy the lavish royal lifestyle he had witnessed aboard Cleopatra's ship docked at Tarsos. He also had his subordinates drive the Parthians out of Anatolia and Syria. (Note: For further information about Publius Ventidius Bassus and his victory over Parthian forces at the Battle of Mount Gindarus, see Kennedy (1996, pp. 80–81).)

Cleopatra carefully chose Antony as her partner for producing further heirs; he was the most powerful Roman figure following Caesar's demise. With triumvir powers, Antony also had the broad authority to restore former Ptolemaic lands, which were currently in Roman hands, to Cleopatra. While both Cilicia and Cyprus were certainly under Cleopatra's control by 19 November 38 BC, the transfer probably occurred earlier in the winter of 41–40 BC, during her time spent with Antony.

By the spring of 40 BC, Antony left Egypt due to troubles in Syria, where his governor Lucius Decidius Saxa was killed and his army taken by Quintus Labienus, a former officer under Cassius who now served the Parthian Empire. Cleopatra provided Antony with 200 ships for his campaign and as payment for her newly acquired territories. She would not see Antony again until 37 BC, but she maintained correspondence, and evidence suggests she kept a spy in his camp. By the end of 40 BC, Cleopatra had given birth to twins, a boy named Alexander Helios and a girl named Cleopatra Selene II, both of whom Antony acknowledged as his children. Helios (the Sun) and Selene (the Moon) were symbolic of a new era of societal rejuvenation, as well as an indication that Cleopatra hoped Antony would repeat the exploits of Alexander the Great by conquering the Parthians.

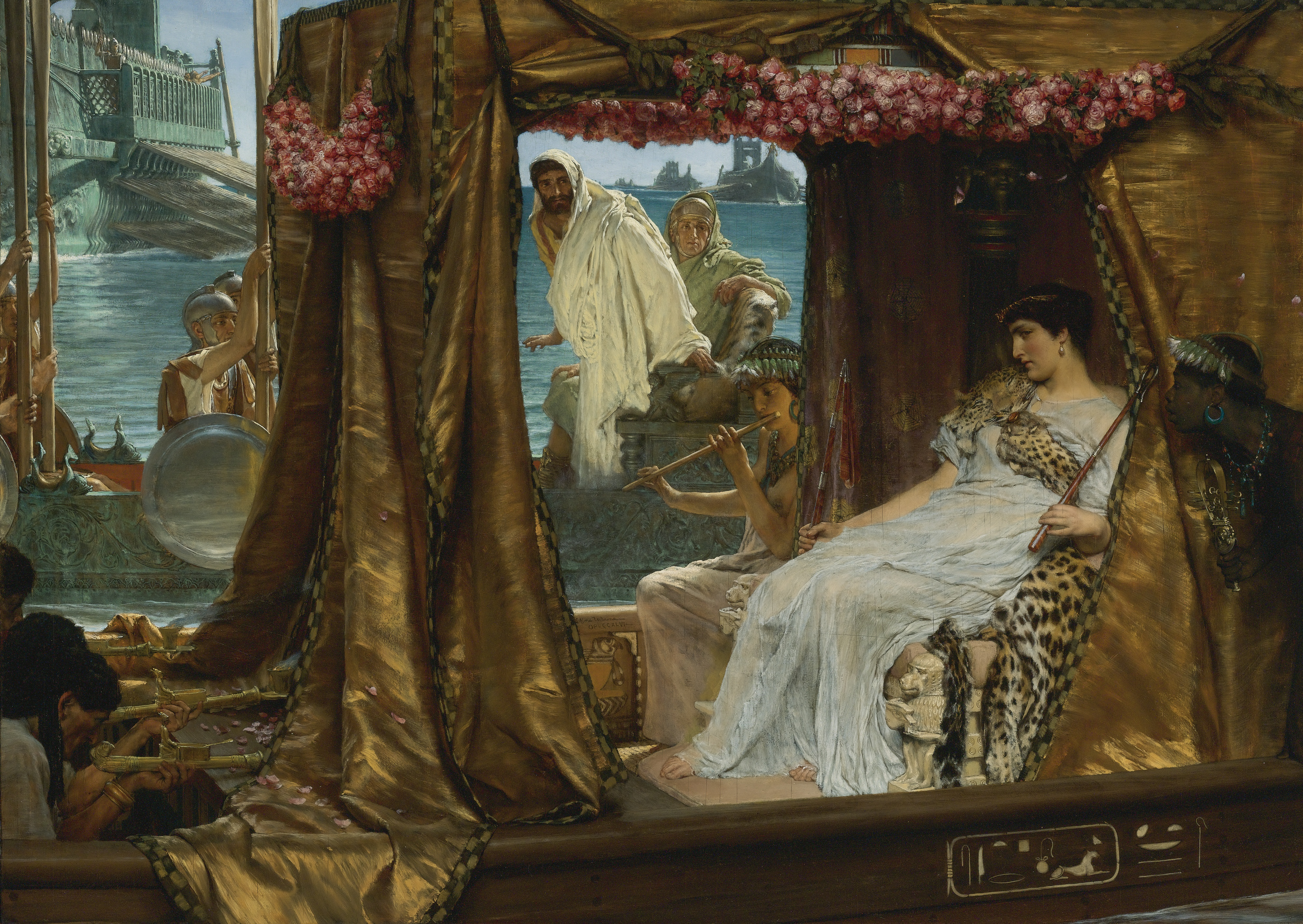
The Meeting of Antony and Cleopatra (1885), by Lawrence Alma-Tadema

Antony's Parthian campaign in the east was disrupted by the events of the Perusine War (41–40 BC), initiated by his ambitious wife Fulvia against Octavian in the hopes of making her husband the undisputed leader of Rome. It has been suggested that Fulvia wanted to cleave Antony away from Cleopatra, but the conflict emerged in Italy even before Cleopatra's meeting with Antony at Tarsos. Octavian besieged Fulvia and Antony's brother Lucius at Perusia (modern Perugia, Italy), and exiled them from Italy, after which Fulvia died at Sicyon in Greece while attempting to reach Antony. Her sudden death led to a reconciliation of Octavian and Antony at Brundisium in Italy in September 40 BC. Although the agreement struck at Brundisium solidified Antony's control of Roman territories east of the Ionian Sea, it also stipulated that he concede Italia, Hispania, and Gaul, and marry Octavian's sister Octavia the Younger, a potential rival for Cleopatra.

In December 40 BC, Cleopatra received Herod in Alexandria as a refugee from Judea, where Antony had installed him as tetrarch. Herod came into conflict with the Hasmonean king Antigonus II Mattathias, who imprisoned Herod's brother and fellow tetrarch Phasael and executed him as Herod fled toward Cleopatra's court. Cleopatra offered to provide Herod a military assignment, but he declined and traveled to Rome, where Octavian and Antony named him king of Judea. This act put Herod on a collision course with Cleopatra, who would desire to reclaim the former Ptolemaic territories that comprised his new Herodian kingdom.

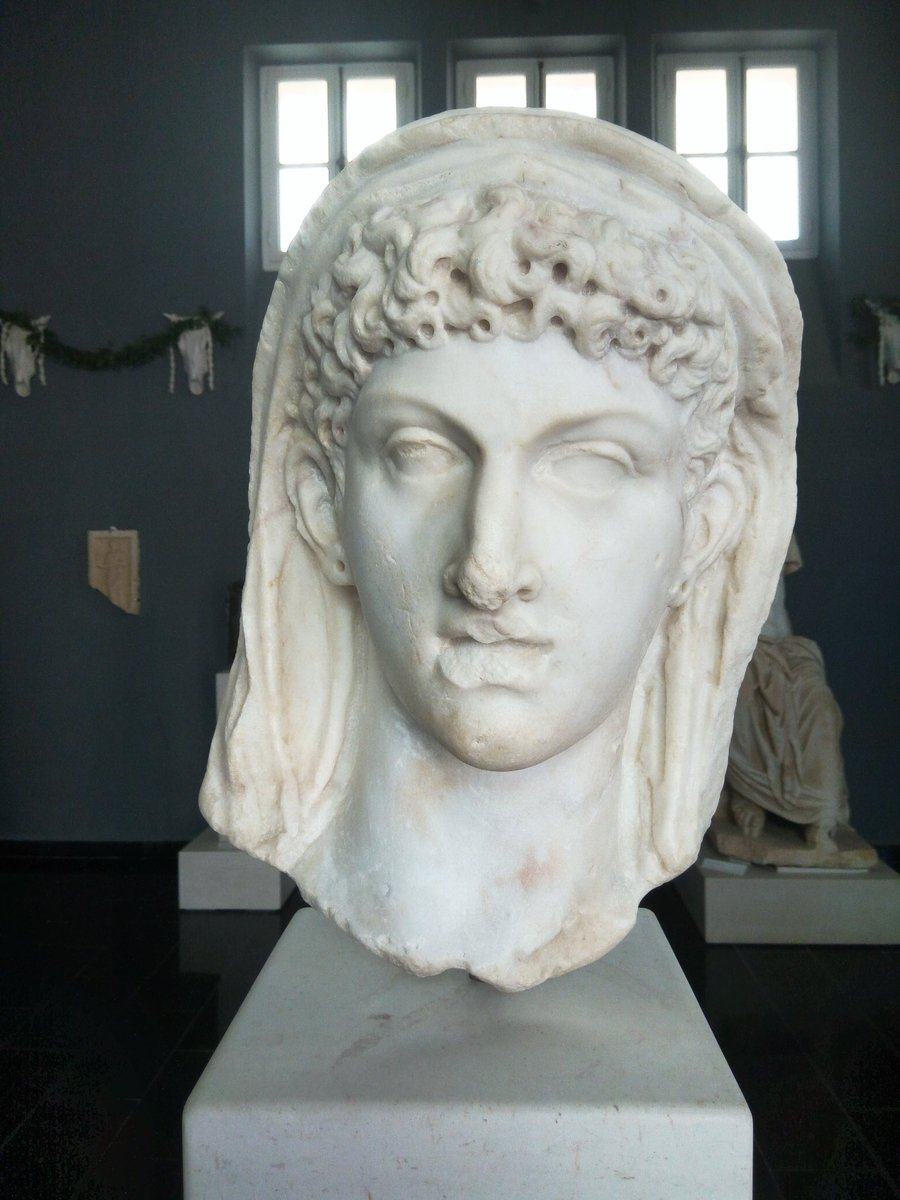
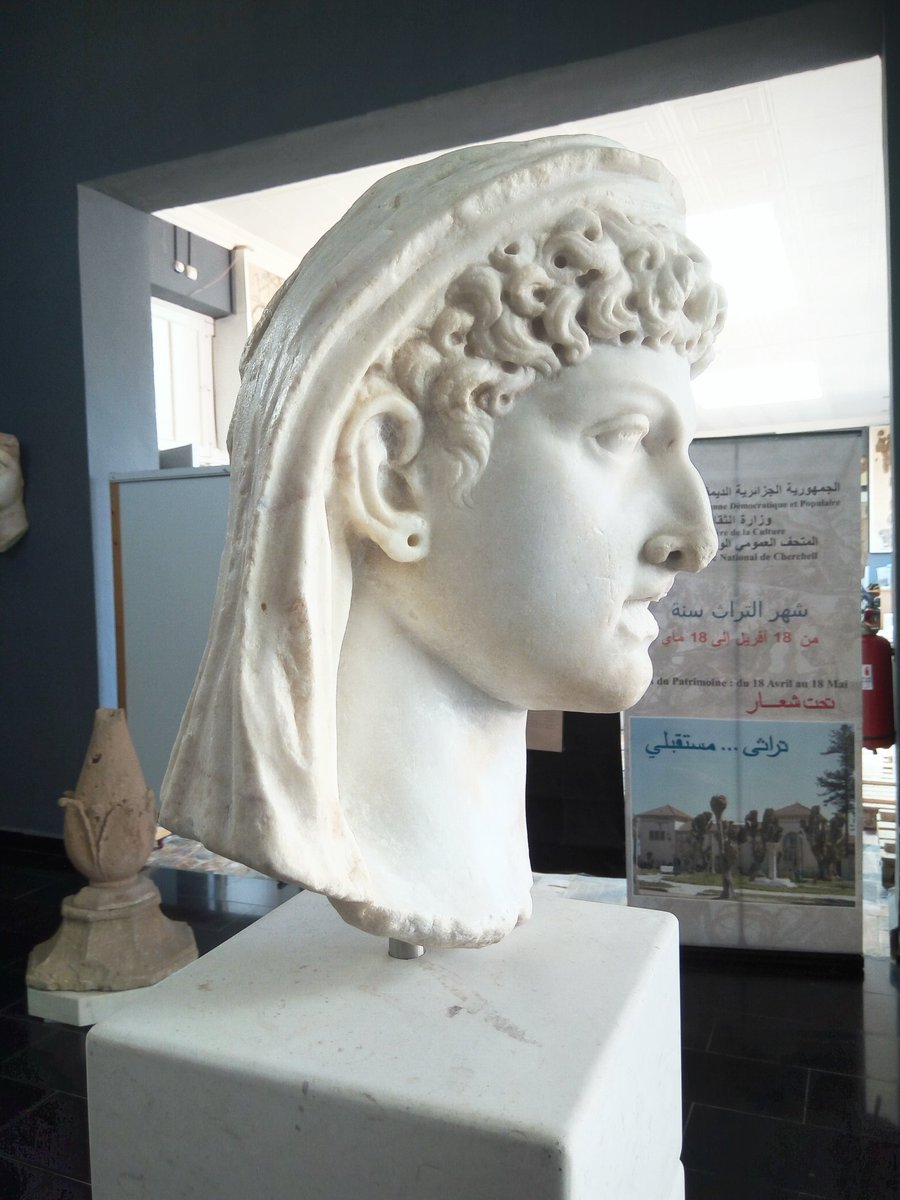
An ancient Roman sculpture possibly depicting either Cleopatra (Note: Ferroukhi (2001a, p. 219) provides a detailed discussion about this bust and its ambiguities, noting that it could represent Cleopatra, but that it is more likely her daughter Cleopatra Selene II. Kleiner (2005, pp. 155–156) argues in favor of its depicting Cleopatra rather than her daughter, while Varner (2004, p. 20) mentions only Cleopatra as a possible likeness. Roller (2003, p. 139) observes that it could be either Cleopatra or Cleopatra Selene II, while arguing the same ambiguity applies to the other sculpted head from Cherchel featuring a veil. In regards to the latter head, Ferroukhi (2001b, p. 242) indicates it as a possible portrait of Cleopatra, not Cleoptra Selene II, from the early 1st century AD while also arguing that its masculine features, earrings, and apparent toga (the veil being a component of it) could likely mean it was intended to depict a Numidian nobleman. Fletcher (2008, image plates between pp. 246–247) disagrees about the veiled head, arguing that it was commissioned by Cleopatra Selene II at Iol (Caesarea Mauretaniae) and was meant to depict her mother, Cleopatra.) or her daughter, Cleopatra Selene II, Queen of Mauretania, located in the Archaeological Museum of Cherchell, Algeria

Relations between Antony and Cleopatra perhaps soured when he married Octavia and sired her two children, Antonia the Elder in 39 BC and Antonia Minor in 36 BC, and moved his headquarters to Athens. However, Cleopatra's position in Egypt was secure. Her rival Herod was occupied with civil war in Judea that required heavy Roman military assistance, but received none from Cleopatra. Since Antony and Octavian's triumviral authority had expired on 1 January 37 BC, Octavia arranged for a meeting at Tarentum, where the triumvirate was officially extended to the end of 33 BC. With two legions granted by Octavian and a thousand soldiers lent by Octavia, Antony traveled to Antioch, where he prepared for war against the Parthians.

Antony summoned Cleopatra to Antioch to discuss pressing issues, such as Herod's kingdom and financial support for his Parthian campaign. Cleopatra brought her now three-year-old twins to Antioch, where Antony saw them for the first time and where they probably first received their surnames Helios and Selene as part of Antony and Cleopatra's ambitious plans for the future. In order to stabilize the east, Antony not only enlarged Cleopatra's domain, but established new ruling dynasties and client rulers who would be loyal to him, yet would ultimately outlast him. (Note: According to Roller (2010, pp. 91–92), these client state rulers installed by Antony included Herod, Amyntas of Galatia, Polemon I of Pontus, and Archelaus of Cappadocia.)

In this arrangement Cleopatra gained significant former Ptolemaic territories in the Levant, including nearly all of Phoenicia (Lebanon) minus Tyre and Sidon, which remained in Roman hands. She also received Ptolemais Akko (modern Acre, Israel), a city that was established by Ptolemy II. Antony gave Cleopatra, a descendant of the Seleucid dynasty, the region of Coele-Syria along the upper Orontes River. She was even given the region surrounding Jericho in Palestine, but she leased this territory back to Herod. She was also given a portion of the Nabataean Kingdom around the Gulf of Aqaba on the Red Sea, including Ailana (modern Aqaba, Jordan), at the expense of Herod's cousin King Malichus I. To the west Cleopatra received Cyrene along the Libyan coast, as well as Itanos and Olous in Roman Crete. Although still administered by Roman officials, these territories nevertheless enriched her kingdom and led her to declare the inauguration of a new era by double-dating her coinage in 36 BC.

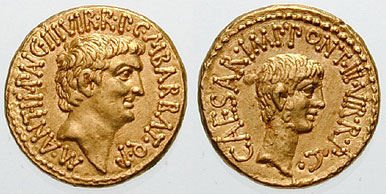
Roman aureus bearing the portraits of Mark Antony (left) and Octavian (right), issued in 41 BC to celebrate the establishment of the Second Triumvirate by Octavian, Antony and Marcus Aemilius Lepidus in 43 BC

Antony's enlargement of the Ptolemaic realm by relinquishing directly controlled Roman territory was exploited by his rival Octavian, who tapped into the public sentiment in Rome against the empowerment of a foreign queen at the expense of their Republic. Octavian, fostering the narrative that Antony was neglecting his virtuous Roman wife Octavia, granted both her and Livia, his own wife, extraordinary privileges of sacrosanctity. Some 50 years before, Cornelia Africana, daughter of Scipio Africanus, had been the first living Roman woman to have a statue dedicated to her. Octavian now had statues erected of Octavia and Livia, most likely in the Forum of Caesar to rival that of Cleopatra's, erected by Caesar.

In 36 BC, Cleopatra accompanied Antony to the Euphrates in his journey toward invading the Parthian Empire. She then returned to Egypt, perhaps due to her advanced state of pregnancy. By the summer of 36 BC, she had given birth to a son Ptolemy Philadelphus, her third child with Antony.

Antony's Parthian campaign in 36 BC failed for a number of reasons, in particular the betrayal of Artavasdes II of Armenia, who defected to the Parthian side. After losing some 30,000 men, more than Crassus at Carrhae, Antony arrived at Leukokome near Berytus (modern Beirut, Lebanon) in December, engaged in heavy drinking before Cleopatra arrived to provide funds and clothing for his battered troops. Antony, seeking to avoid the risks involved in returning to Rome, returned to Alexandria with Cleopatra to see his newborn son.

==== Donations of Alexandria ====
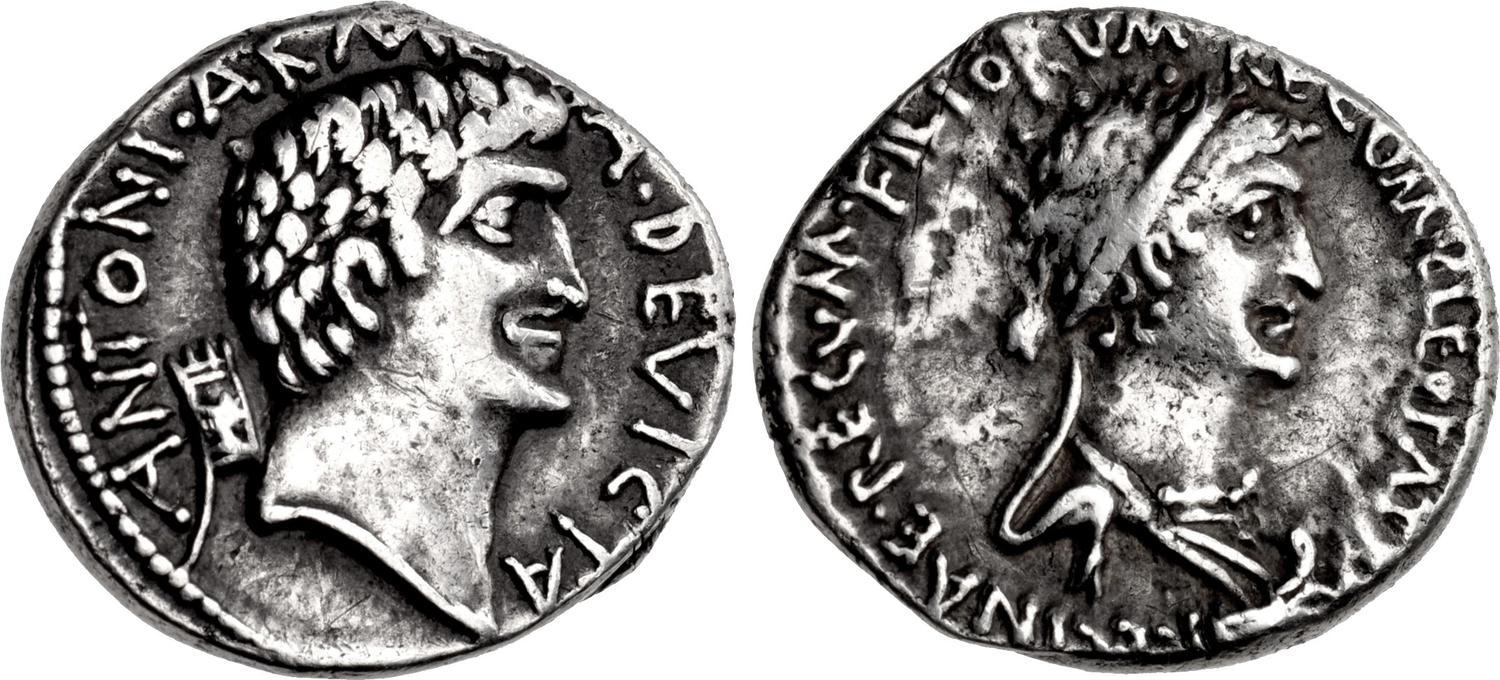
A denarius minted by Antony in 34 BC with his portrait on the obverse, which bears the inscription reading "ANTONI ARMENIA DEVICTA" (For Antony, Armenia having been vanquished), alluding to his Armenian campaign. The reverse features Cleopatra, with the inscription "CLEOPATR[AE] REGINAE REGVM FILIORVM REGVM" (For Cleopatra, Queen of Kings and of the children of kings). The mention of her children on the reverse refers to the Donations of Alexandria.

As Antony prepared for another Parthian expedition in 35 BC, this time aimed at their ally Armenia, Octavia traveled to Athens with 2,000 troops allegedly to support Antony, but most likely in a scheme devised by Octavian to embarrass Antony for his military losses. (Note: Bringmann (2007, p. 301) claims that Octavia Minor provided Antony with 1,200 troops, not 2,000 as stated in Roller (2010, pp. 97–98) and Burstein (2004, pp. 27–28).) Antony received these troops but told Octavia not to stray east of Athens as he and Cleopatra traveled to Antioch, only to suddenly and inexplicably abandon the military campaign and head back to Alexandria. When Octavia returned to Rome, Octavian portrayed his sister as a victim wronged by Antony, although she refused to leave Antony's household. Octavian's confidence grew as he eliminated his rivals in the west, including Sextus Pompeius and even his fellow triumvir Lepidus, who was placed under house arrest after revolting against Octavian in Sicily.

Antony sent Dellius as his envoy to King Artavasdes II of Armenia in 34 BC to negotiate a potential marriage alliance between Artavasdes's daughter and Alexander Helios, the son of Antony and Cleopatra. When the king declined this, Antony marched his army into Armenia, defeated their forces and captured the king and his family. Antony then held a military parade in Alexandria as an imitation of a Roman triumph, dressed as Dionysus and riding into the city on a chariot to present the royal prisoners to Cleopatra, who was seated on a golden throne above a silver dais. Romans criticized news of this event as a perversion of time-honored Roman rituals to be enjoyed instead by an Egyptian queen.

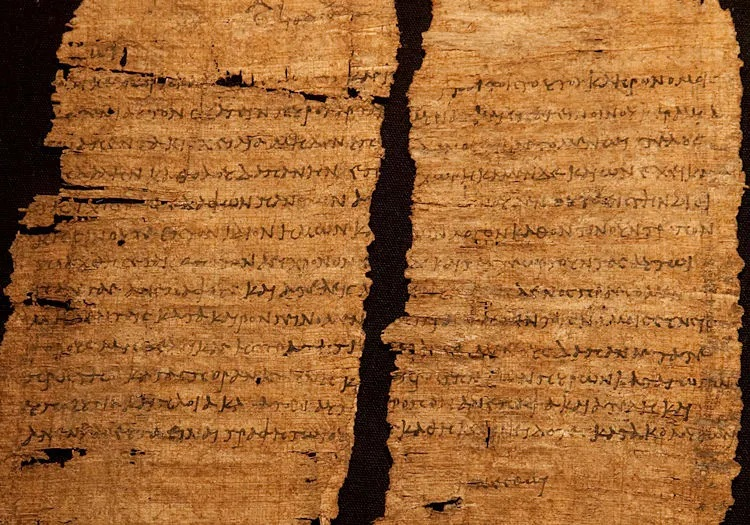
A papyrus document (Papyrus Bingen 45) received in February 33 BC granting tax exemptions to a person in Egypt with γινέσθωι (ginésthōi; lit. "make it happen" or "so be it") added in Greek, possibly by Cleopatra's own hand

In an event held at the gymnasium soon after the triumph, Cleopatra dressed as Isis and declared herself and her son Caesarion as Queen of Kings and King of Kings, Alexander Helios as king of Armenia, Media, and Parthia, and two-year-old Ptolemy Philadelphus as king of Syria and Cilicia. Cleopatra Selene II was bestowed with Crete and Cyrene. Antony and Cleopatra may have been wed during this ceremony. (Note: Roller (2010, p. 100) says that it is unclear if Antony and Cleopatra were ever truly married. Burstein (2004, pp. xxii, 29) says that the marriage publicly sealed Antony's alliance with Cleopatra and, in defiance of Octavian, he would divorce Octavia in 32 BC. Coins of Antony and Cleopatra depict them in the typical manner of a Hellenistic royal couple, as explained by Roller (2010, p. 100).) Antony sent a report to Rome requesting ratification of these territorial claims, now known as the Donations of Alexandria. Octavian wanted to publicize it for propaganda purposes, but the two consuls, both supporters of Antony, had it censored from public view.

In late 34 BC, Antony and Octavian engaged in a heated war of propaganda that would last for years. (Note: Jones (2006, p. xiv) writes that "Octavian waged a propaganda war against Antony and Cleopatra, stressing Cleopatra's status as a woman and a foreigner who wished to share in Roman power.") Antony claimed that Octavian had illegally deposed Lepidus from their triumvirate and barred him from raising troops in Italy; Octavian accused Antony of unlawfully detaining the king of Armenia, marrying Cleopatra despite still being married to his sister Octavia, and wrongfully claiming Caesarion as Caesar's heir instead of Octavian. The litany of accusations and gossip associated with this propaganda war has shaped the popular perceptions about Cleopatra from Augustan-period literature through to various media in modern times. She was said to have brainwashed Antony with witchcraft and sorcery. Pliny the Elder claims in his Natural History that Cleopatra once dissolved a pearl worth tens of millions of sesterces in vinegar just to win a dinner-party bet. Gaius Calvisius Sabinus later admitted that he had fabricated the accusation that Antony had stolen books from the Library of Pergamum to restock the Library of Alexandria.

A papyrus document (Papyrus Bingen 45) received on 23 February 33 BC, later used to wrap a mummy, possibly contains an autograph of Cleopatra. The official ordinance grants certain tax exemptions in Egypt to either Quintus Caecillius or Publius Canidius Crassus, (Note: Stanley M. Burstein, in Burstein (2004, p. 33) provides the name Quintus Cascellius as the recipient of the tax exemption, not the Publius Canidius Crassus provided by Duane W. Roller in Roller (2010, p. 134).) a former Roman consul and Antony's confidant who would command his land forces at Actium. A subscription in a different handwriting at the bottom of the papyrus reads "make it happen" or "so be it" (Ancient Greek: γινέσθωι, romanized: ginésthōi); (Note: Reece (2017, p. 203) notes that "[t]he fragmentary texts of ancient Greek papyri do not often make their way into the modern public arena, but this one has, and with fascinating results, while remaining almost entirely unacknowledged is the remarkable fact that Cleopatra's one-word subscription contains a blatant spelling error: γινέσθωι, with a superfluous iota adscript." This spelling error "has not been noted by the popular media", however, being "simply transliterated [...] including, without comment, the superfluous iota adscript" (p. 208). Even in academic sources, the misspelling was largely unacknowledged or quietly corrected (pp. 206–208, 210). Although described as "'normal' orthography" (in contrast with "'correct' orthography") by Peter van Minnen (p. 208), the spelling error is "much rarer and more puzzling" than the sort one would expect from the Greek papyri from Egypt (p. 210)—so rare, in fact, that it occurs only twice in the 70,000 Greek papyri between the 3rd century BC and 8th century AD in the Papyrological Navigator's database. This is especially so when considering it was added to a word "with no etymological or morphological reason for having an iota adscript" (p. 210) and was written by "the well-educated, native Greek-speaking, queen of Egypt" Cleopatra VII (p. 208).) this is possibly Cleopatra's autograph, as it was Ptolemaic practice to countersign documents to avoid forgery.

==== Battle of Actium ====
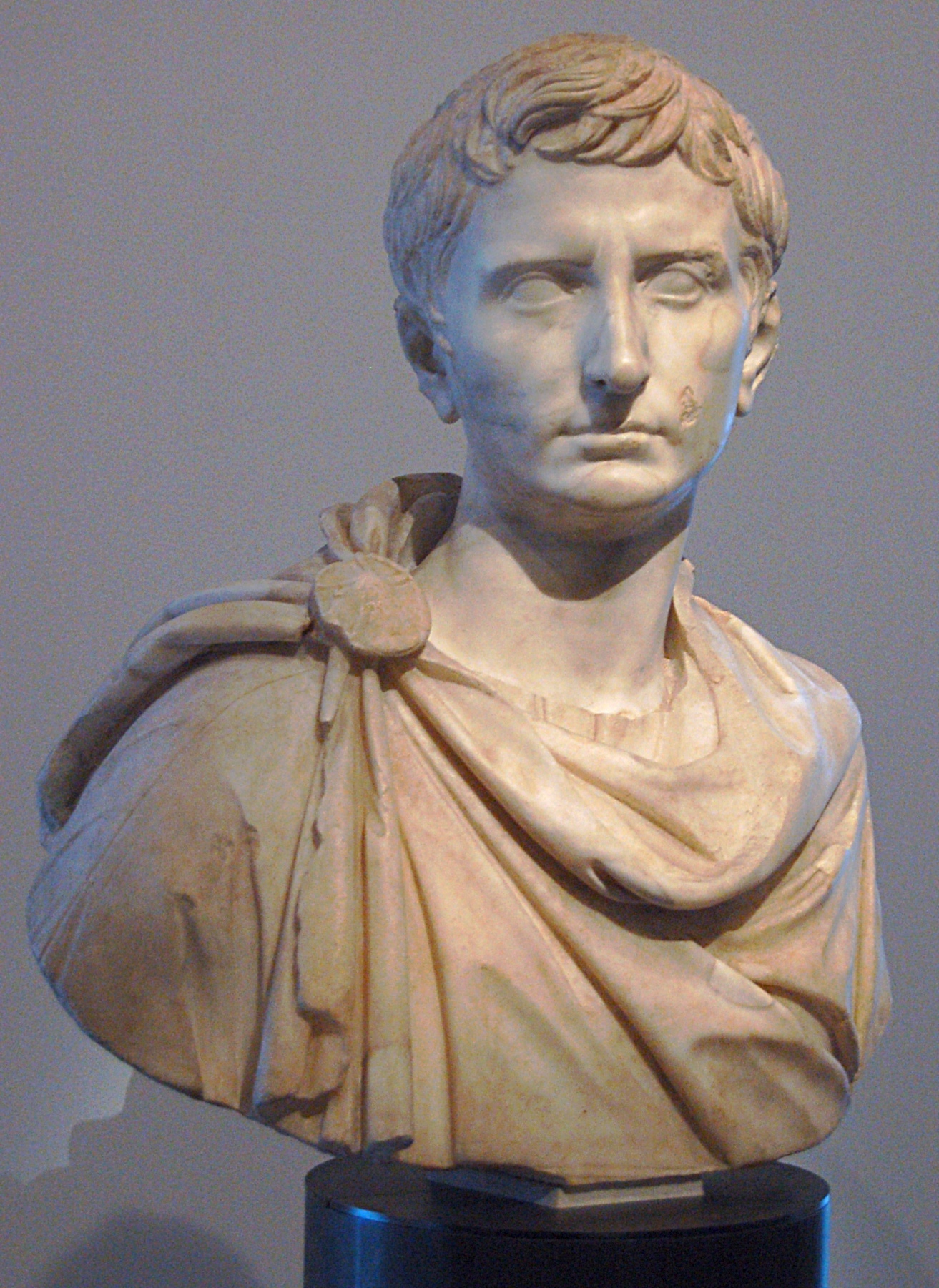
A reconstructed bust of Augustus as a younger Octavian, dated c. 30 BC

In a speech to the Roman Senate on the first day of his consulship on 1 January 33 BC, Octavian accused Antony of attempting to subvert Roman freedoms and territorial integrity as a slave to his Oriental queen. Before Antony and Octavian's joint imperium expired on 31 December 33 BC, Antony declared Caesarion as Caesar's true heir in an attempt to undermine Octavian. In 32 BC, Antony's supporters Gaius Sosius and Gnaeus Domitius Ahenobarbus became consuls. Sosius gave a fiery speech condemning Octavian, now a private citizen without public office, and introduced pieces of legislation against him. During the next senatorial session, Octavian entered the Senate house with armed guards and levied his own accusations against the consuls. Intimidated by this act, the consuls and over 200 senators fled Rome the next day to join Antony's side.

Antony and Cleopatra traveled together to Ephesus in 32 BC, where she provided him with 200 of the 800 naval ships he was able to acquire. Ahenobarbus, wary of having Octavian's propaganda confirmed to the public, attempted to persuade Antony to have Cleopatra excluded from the campaign against Octavian. Publius Canidius Crassus replied that Cleopatra was funding the war effort and was a competent monarch. Cleopatra refused Antony's requests that she return to Egypt, judging that by blocking Octavian in Greece she could more easily defend Egypt. Her insistence that she be involved in the battle for Greece led to the defections of prominent Romans, such as Ahenobarbus and Lucius Munatius Plancus.

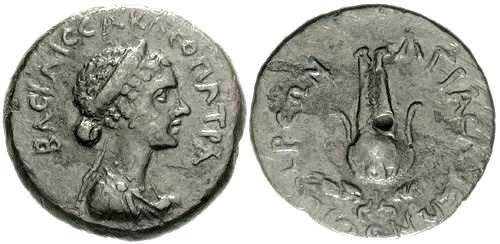
A hemiobol coin of Cleopatra struck in 32/31 BC showing her wearing the royal diadem

During the spring of 32 BC, Antony and Cleopatra traveled to Athens, where she persuaded him to divorce Octavia. Plancus then advised Octavian that he should seize Antony's will, invested with the Vestal Virgins. Octavian forcefully acquired the document from the Temple of Vesta, and it became a useful tool in the propaganda war against Antony and Cleopatra. In a show of loyalty to Rome, Octavian decided to begin construction of his own mausoleum at the Campus Martius. His election as consul in 31 BC also improved his legal standing. With Antony's will made public, Rome declared war on Cleopatra, not Antony. (Note: As explained by Jones (2006, p. 147), "politically, Octavian had to walk a fine line as he prepared to engage in open hostilities with Antony. He was careful to minimize associations with civil war, as the Roman people had already suffered through many years of civil conflict and Octavian could risk losing support if he declared war on a fellow citizen.") The legal argument for war was based less on Cleopatra's territorial acquisitions and more on the fact that she was providing military support to a private citizen now that Antony's triumviral authority had expired.

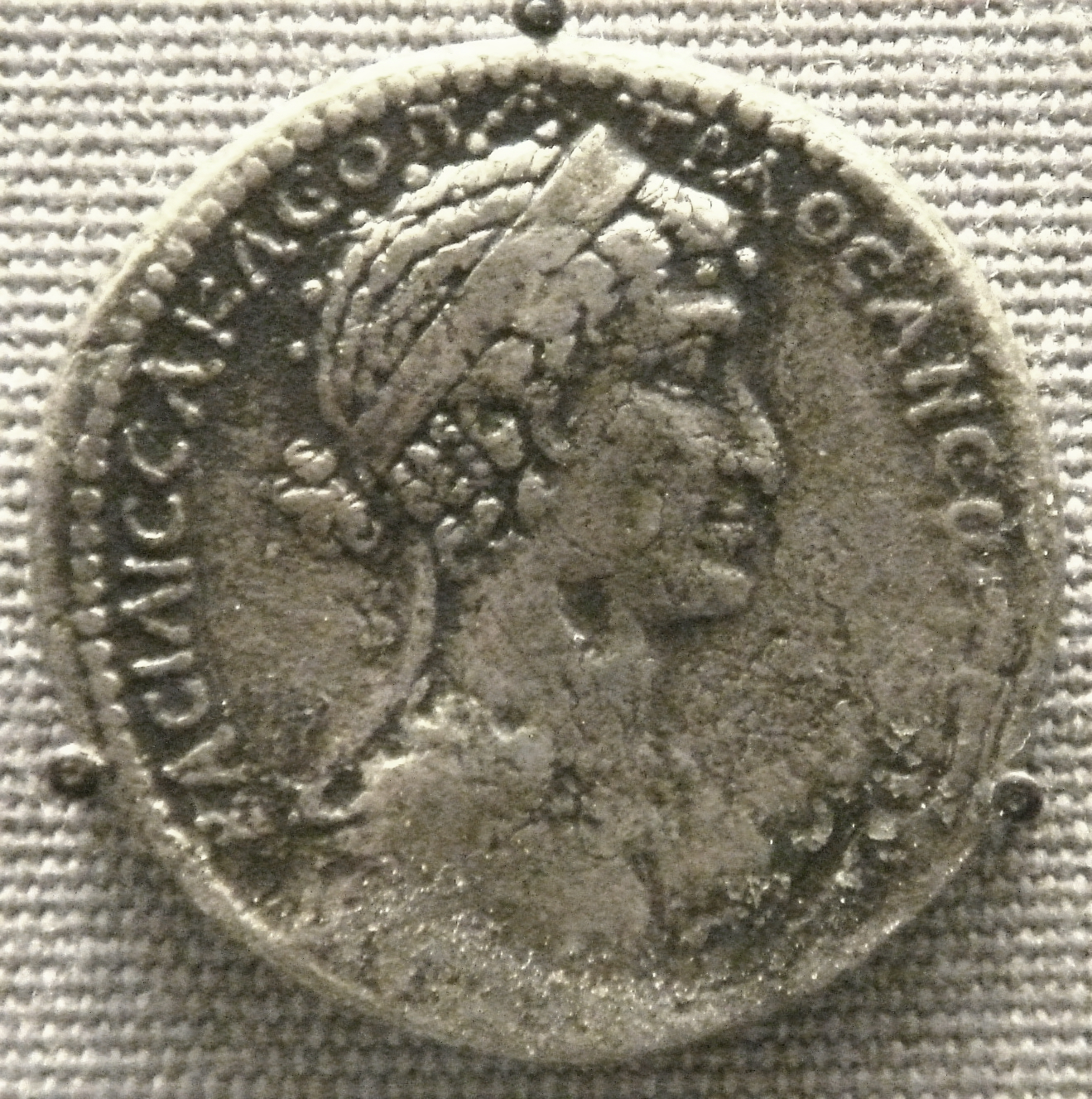
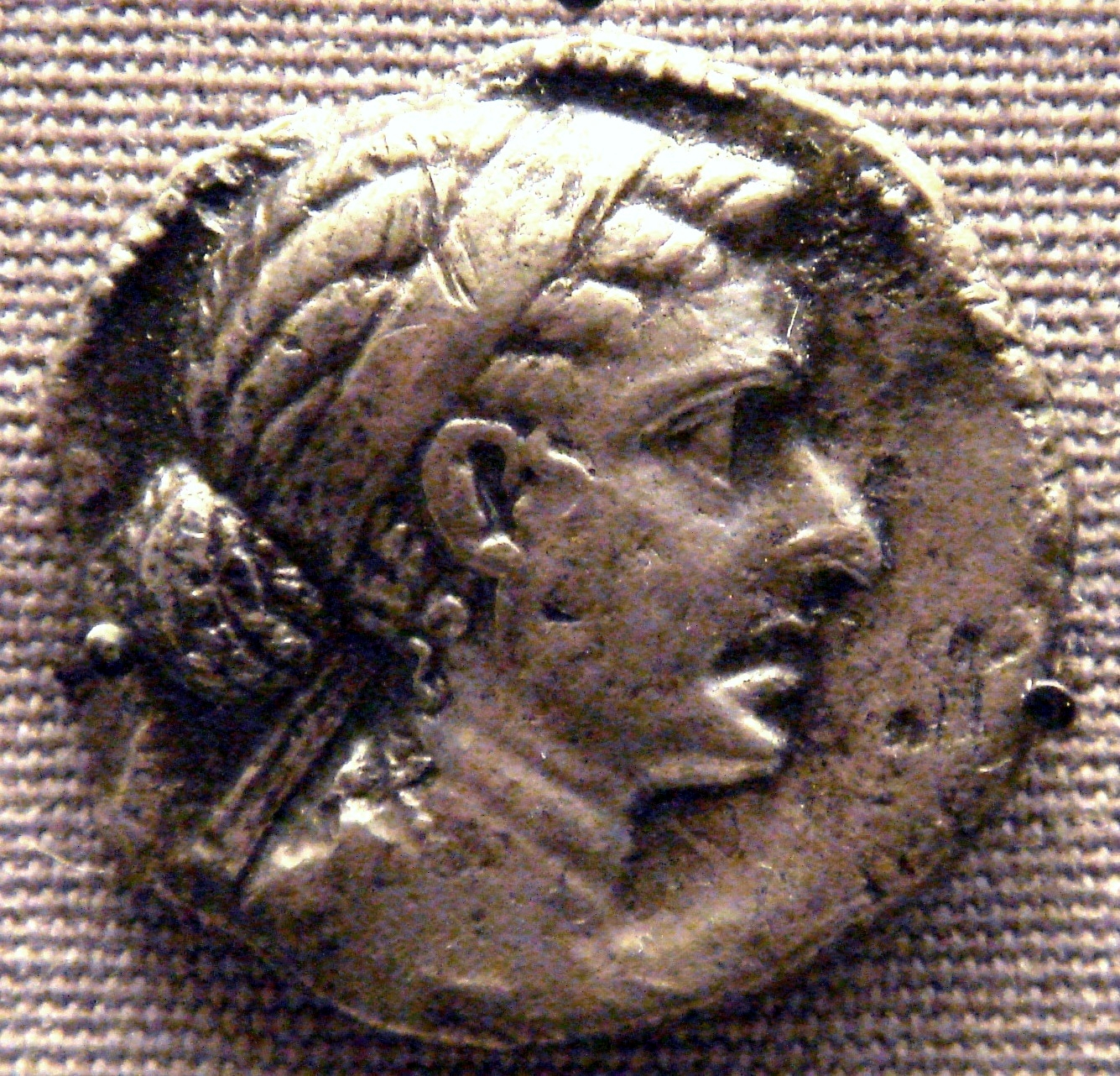
Left: A silver tetradrachm of Cleopatra minted at Seleucia Pieria, Syria
Right: A silver tetradrachm of Cleopatra minted at Ascalon, Israel

Antony and Cleopatra had a larger fleet than Octavian, but unlike him they did not have a fully professional naval force. Antony wanted to cross the Adriatic Sea and blockade Octavian at either Tarentum or Brundisium, but Cleopatra, concerned primarily with defending Egypt, chose to attack Italy directly. Antony and Cleopatra set up their winter headquarters at Patrai in Greece, and by the spring of 31 BC they had moved to Actium, on the southern side of the Ambracian Gulf.

Various allied kings supported Cleopatra and Antony, but Cleopatra had already been in conflict with Herod, and an earthquake in Judea provided him an excuse to be absent from the campaign. They also lost the support of Malichus I of Nabatea, which would prove to have strategic consequences. Antony and Cleopatra lost several skirmishes against Octavian around Actium during the summer of 31 BC. Defections to Octavian's camp continued, including Antony's long-time companion Dellius and the allied kings Amyntas of Galatia and Deiotaros of Paphlagonia. While some in Antony's camp suggested abandoning the naval conflict to retreat inland, Cleopatra urged a naval confrontation to keep Octavian's fleet away from Egypt.

On 2 September 31 BC Octavian's naval forces, led by Marcus Vipsanius Agrippa, met those of Antony and Cleopatra at the Battle of Actium. Cleopatra, aboard her flagship, the Antonias, commanded 60 ships at the mouth of the Ambracian Gulf, at the rear of the fleet; Antony's officers likely sought to marginalize her during the battle. Antony had ordered that their ships should have sails on board for a better chance to pursue or flee from the enemy, which Cleopatra, ever concerned about defending Egypt, used to swiftly move through the area of major combat in a strategic withdrawal to the Peloponnese.

Partisan Roman writers would later accuse Cleopatra of cowardly deserting Antony, but their original intention of keeping their sails on board may have been to break the blockade and salvage as much of their fleet as possible. Antony followed Cleopatra and boarded her ship, identified by its distinctive purple sails, as the two escaped the battle and headed for Tainaron. Antony reportedly avoided Cleopatra during this three-day voyage, until her ladies in waiting at Tainaron urged him to speak with her. The Battle of Actium raged on without Cleopatra and Antony until the morning of 3 September, and was followed by massive defections of officers, troops, and allied kings to Octavian's side.

=== Downfall and death ===
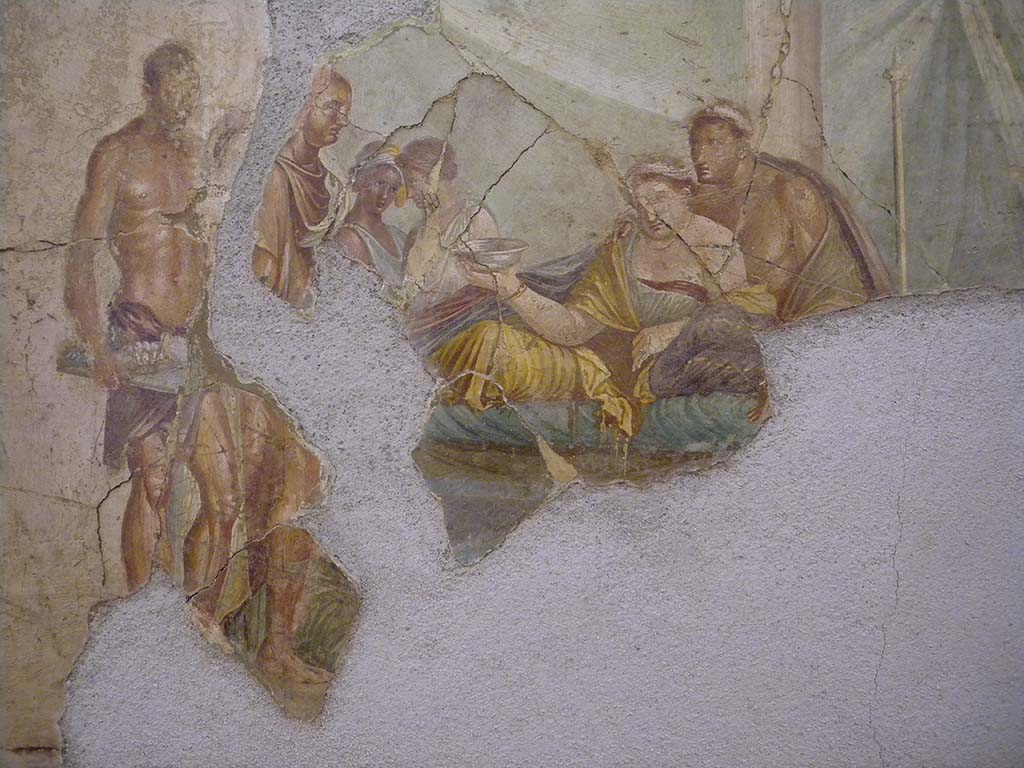
A Roman painting from the House of Giuseppe II in Pompeii, early 1st century AD, most likely depicting Cleopatra, wearing her royal diadem and consuming poison in an act of suicide, while her son Caesarion, also wearing a royal diadem, stands behind her

While Octavian occupied Athens, Antony and Cleopatra landed at Paraitonion in Egypt. The couple then went their separate ways, Antony to Cyrene to raise more troops and Cleopatra to the Alexandrian harbor in an attempt to mislead the oppositional party and portray the activities in Greece as a victory. She was afraid that news about the outcome of the Battle of Actium would lead to a rebellion. It is uncertain whether, at this time, she executed Artavasdes II of Armenia and sent his head to his rival, Artavasdes I of Media Atropatene, in an attempt to strike an alliance with him.

Lucius Pinarius, Antony's appointed governor of Cyrene, received word that Octavian had won the Battle of Actium before Antony's messengers could arrive at his court. Pinarius had these messengers executed and then defected to Octavian's side, surrendering to him the four legions under his command that Antony desired to obtain. Antony nearly committed suicide after hearing news of this, but his staff officers stopped him. In Alexandria, he built a reclusive cottage on the island of Pharos that he nicknamed the Timoneion, after the philosopher Timon of Athens, who was famous for his cynicism and misanthropy. Herod, who had personally advised Antony after the Battle of Actium that he should betray Cleopatra, traveled to Rhodes to meet Octavian and resign his kingship out of loyalty to Antony. Impressed by his speech and sense of loyalty, Octavian allowed Herod to maintain his position in Judea, further isolating Antony and Cleopatra.

Cleopatra perhaps started to view Antony as a liability by the late summer of 31 BC, when she prepared to leave Egypt to her son Caesarion. Cleopatra planned to relinquish her throne to Caesarion, take her fleet from the Mediterranean into the Red Sea, and then set sail to a foreign port, perhaps in India, where she could spend time recuperating. She abandoned these plans when Malichus I of Nabatea burned Cleopatra's fleet in revenge for his losses in a war with Herod that Cleopatra had largely initiated. This forced Cleopatra to stay in Egypt and negotiate with Octavian. Although most likely later pro-Octavian propaganda, it was reported that at this time, she started testing the strengths of various poisons on prisoners and her servants.

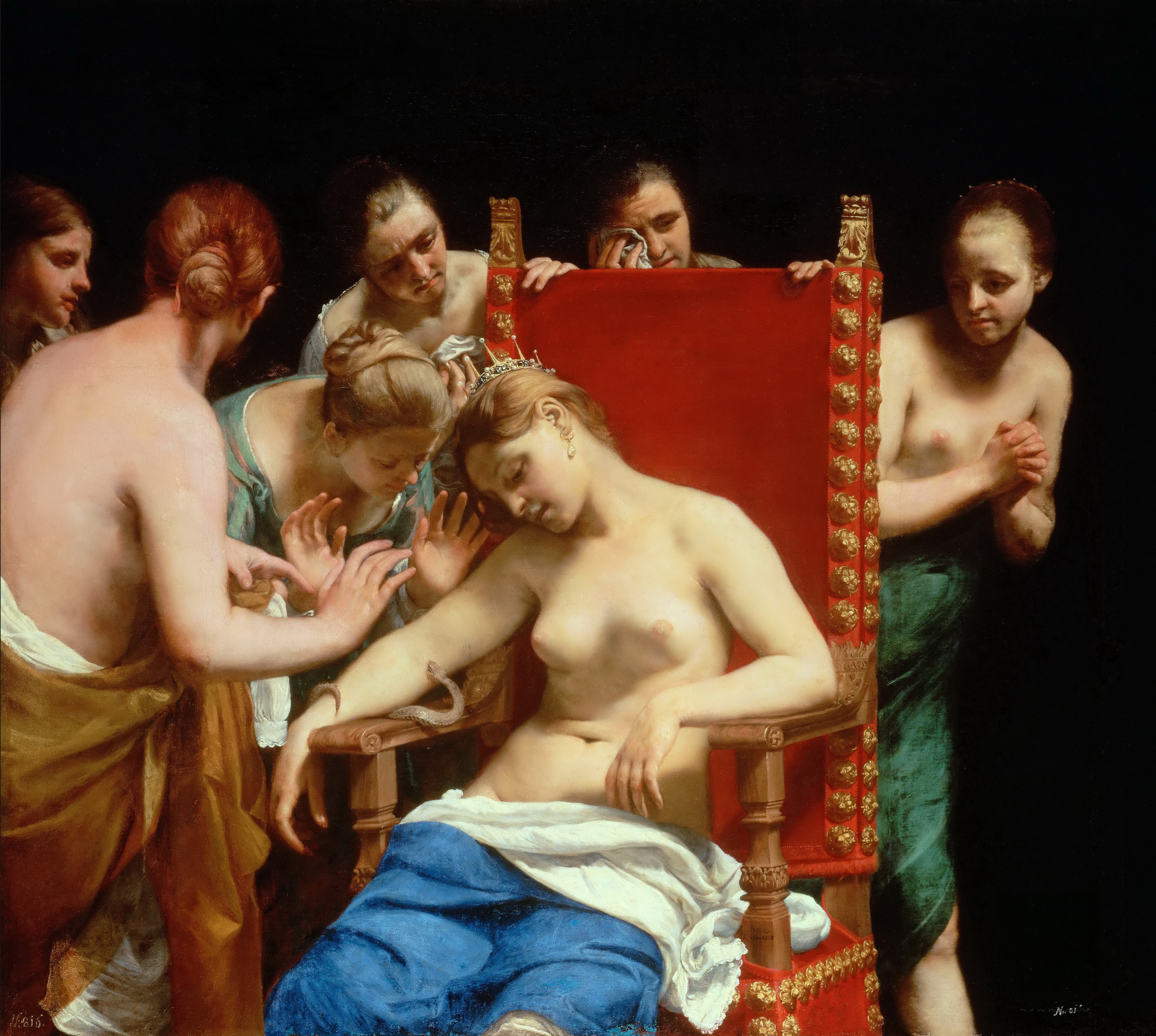
The Death of Cleopatra (1658), by Guido Cagnacci

Cleopatra had Caesarion enter into the ranks of the ephebi, which, along with reliefs on a stele from Koptos dated 21 September 31 BC, demonstrated that Cleopatra was now grooming her son to become the sole ruler of Egypt. In a show of solidarity, Antony had Marcus Antonius Antyllus, his son with Fulvia, enter the ephebi at the same time. Antony and Cleopatra then sent separate messages and envoys to Octavian in Rhodes, although Octavian seems to have replied only to Cleopatra. Cleopatra requested that her children should inherit Egypt and that Antony should be allowed to live there in exile, offered Octavian money in the future, and immediately sent him lavish gifts. Octavian sent his diplomat Thyrsos to Cleopatra after she threatened to burn herself and vast amounts of her treasure within a tomb already under construction. Thyrsos advised her to kill Antony so that her life would be spared, but Antony had Thyrsos flogged and sent back to Octavian without a deal.

After lengthy negotiations with no results, Octavian set out to invade Egypt in the spring of 30 BC, stopping at Ptolemais in Phoenicia, where Herod provided his army with fresh supplies. Octavian moved south and swiftly took Pelousion, while Cornelius Gallus, marching eastward from Cyrene, defeated Antony's forces near Paraitonion. Octavian advanced to Alexandria, but Antony returned and won a small victory over Octavian's tired troops outside the city's hippodrome. However, on 1 August 30 BC, Antony's naval fleet surrendered to Octavian, followed by Antony's cavalry.

Cleopatra hid herself in her tomb with her close attendants and sent a message to Antony that she had committed suicide. In despair, Antony took his own life by stabbing himself in the stomach. According to Plutarch, he was still dying when brought to Cleopatra at her tomb, telling her he had died honorably and that she could trust Octavian's companion Gaius Proculeius over anyone else in his entourage. Proculeius infiltrated her tomb using a ladder and detained the queen. Cleopatra was allowed to embalm and bury Antony within her tomb before she was escorted to the palace.

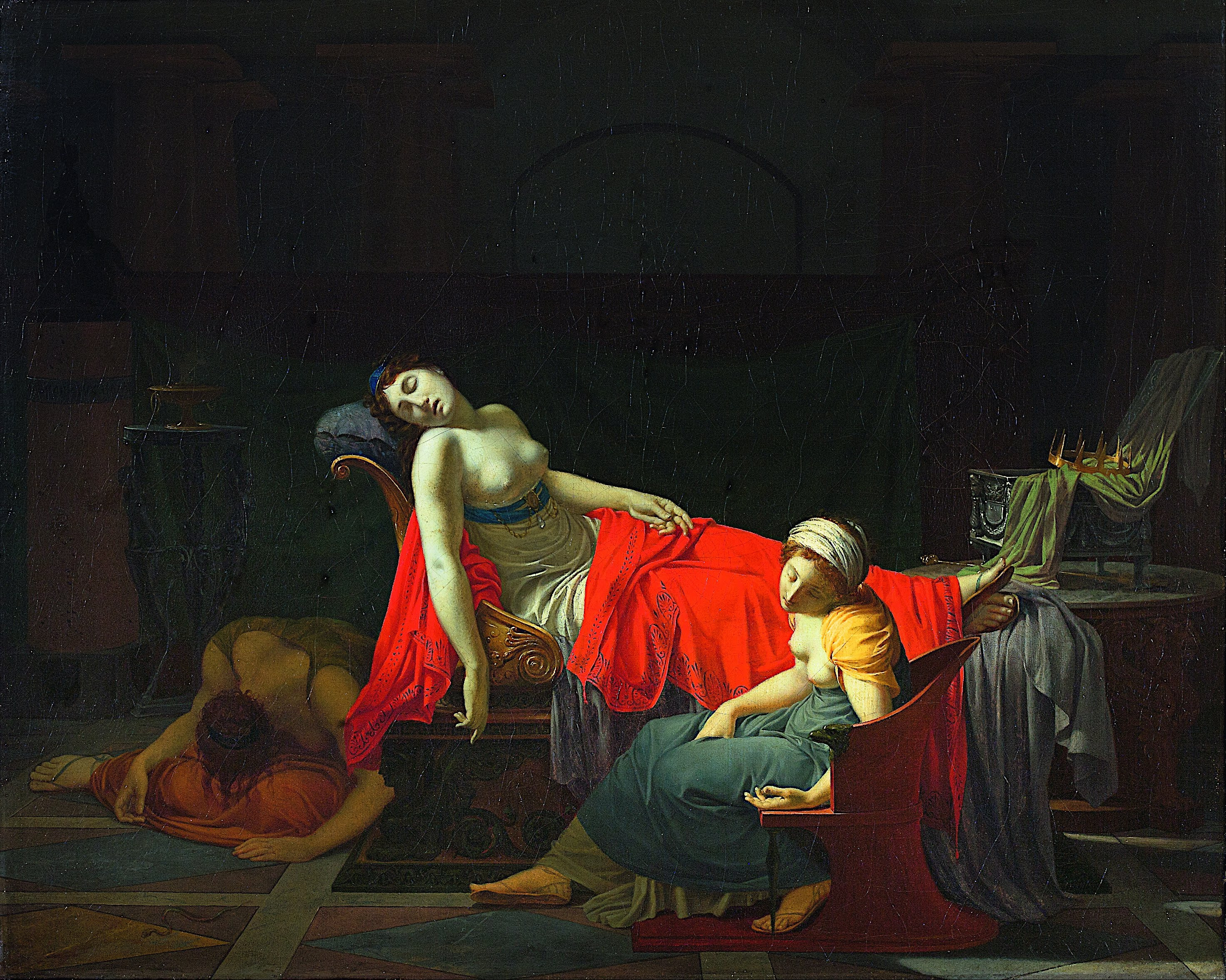
The Death of Cleopatra (1796–1797), by Jean-Baptiste Regnault

Octavian entered Alexandria on 1 August 30 BC, occupied the palace, and seized Cleopatra's three youngest children. When she met with Octavian, Cleopatra told him bluntly, "I will not be led in a triumph" (ou thriambéusomai), according to Livy, a rare recording of her exact words. Octavian promised that he would keep her alive but offered no explanation about his future plans for her kingdom. When a spy informed her that Octavian planned to move her and her children to Rome in three days, she prepared for suicide as she had no intentions of being paraded in a Roman triumph like her sister Arsinoe. It is unclear if Cleopatra's suicide on 12 August 30 BC, at age 39, took place within the palace or her tomb. Her servants Eiras and Charmion apparently accompanied her; they also took their own lives.

This outcome reportedly angered Octavian, but he had Cleopatra buried next to Antony in her tomb. Cleopatra's physician, Olympos, did not explain her cause of death, although the popular belief is that she allowed an asp or Egyptian cobra to bite and poison her. Plutarch relates this tale, but suggests an implement (κνῆστις, knêstis, 'spine, cheese-grater') was used to introduce the toxin by scratching; Dio says that she injected the poison with a needle (βελόνη, belónē), and Strabo argued for an ointment of some kind. (Note: For the translated accounts of both Plutarch and Dio, Jones (2006, pp. 194–195) writes that the implement used to puncture Cleopatra's skin was a hairpin.) Horace corroborates the common belief that it was a venomous snake, but instead states that it was several (serpentēs, 'serpents'). Vergil agrees that it was several serpents. Vergil and Horace's accounts suggest that this belief stemmed from Octavian's propaganda. No venomous snake was found with her body, but she did have tiny puncture wounds on her arm that could have been caused by a needle.

Cleopatra decided in her last moments to send Caesarion away to Upper Egypt, perhaps with plans to flee to Kushite Nubia, Ethiopia, or India. Caesarion returned to Alexandria after Octavian guaranteed him recognition as king. Octavian had him executed around 29 August 30 BC. (Note: Roller (2010, p. 149) and Skeat (1953, pp. 99–100) explain the nominal short-lived reign of Caesarion as lasting 18 days in 30 August BC, as recorded in Clement's Stromata (I.21.129). However, Duane W. Roller, relaying Theodore Cressy Skeat, affirms that Caesarion's reign "was essentially a fiction created by Egyptian chronographers to close the gap between [Cleopatra's] death and official Roman control of Egypt" (Roller 2010, pp. 149, 214, footnote 103). Plutarch, translated by Jones (2006, p. 187), wrote in vague terms that "Octavian had Caesarion killed later, after Cleopatra's death.") Octavian was convinced that there was room for only one Caesar in the world. (Note: Jones (2006, p. 187), translating Plutarch, quotes the philosopher Arius Didymus as saying to Octavian that "it is not good to have too many Caesars", which was apparently enough to convince Octavian to have Caesarion killed.) With the fall of the Ptolemaic Kingdom, Octavian established the Roman province of Egypt, (Note: Contrary to regular Roman provinces, Egypt was established by Octavian as territory under his personal control, barring the Roman Senate from intervening in any of its affairs and appointing his own equestrian governors of Egypt, the first of whom was Gallus. For further information, see Southern (2014, p. 185) and Roller (2010, p. 151).) marking the end of the Hellenistic period. In January of 27 BC Octavian was renamed Augustus ("the revered") and amassed constitutional powers that established him as the first Roman emperor, inaugurating the Principate era of the Roman Empire.

== Cleopatra's kingdom and role as a monarch ==
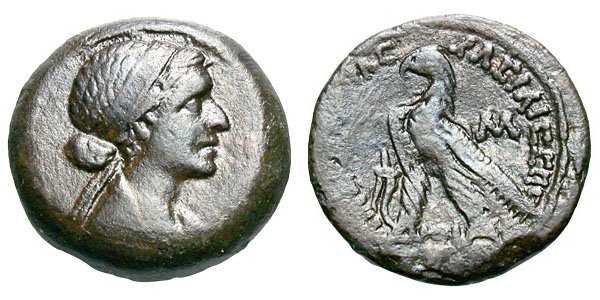
Cleopatra on a coin of 40 drachmai (1 obol) from 51 to 30 BC, minted at Alexandria; on the obverse is a portrait of Cleopatra wearing a diadem, and on the reverse an inscription reading "ΒΑΣΙΛΙΣΣΗΣ ΚΛΕΟΠΑΤΡΑΣ" (Basilissēs Kleopatras) with an eagle standing on a thunderbolt.

Following the tradition of Macedonian rulers, Cleopatra ruled Egypt and other territories such as Cyprus as an absolute monarch, serving as the sole lawgiver of her kingdom. She was the chief religious authority in her realm, presiding over religious ceremonies dedicated to the deities of both the Egyptian and Greek polytheistic faiths. She oversaw the construction of various temples to Egyptian and Greek gods, a synagogue for the Jews in Egypt, and even built the Caesareum of Alexandria, dedicated to the cult worship of her patron and lover Julius Caesar.

Cleopatra was directly involved in her domain's administrative affairs, tackling crises such as famine by ordering royal granaries to distribute food to the starving populace during a drought at the beginning of her reign. A study suggested that volcanic eruptions caused the unfavourable climate and that this contributed to Cleopatra's demise; others expressed skepticism about this hypothesis. Although the command economy that she managed was more of an ideal than a reality, the government attempted to impose price controls, tariffs, and state monopolies for certain goods, fixed exchange rates for foreign currencies, and mandated peasant farmers to stay in their villages during planting and harvesting seasons. Apparent financial troubles led Cleopatra to debase her coinage, which included silver and bronze currencies but no gold coins like those of some of her distant Ptolemaic predecessors.

== Legacy ==
=== Children and successors ===
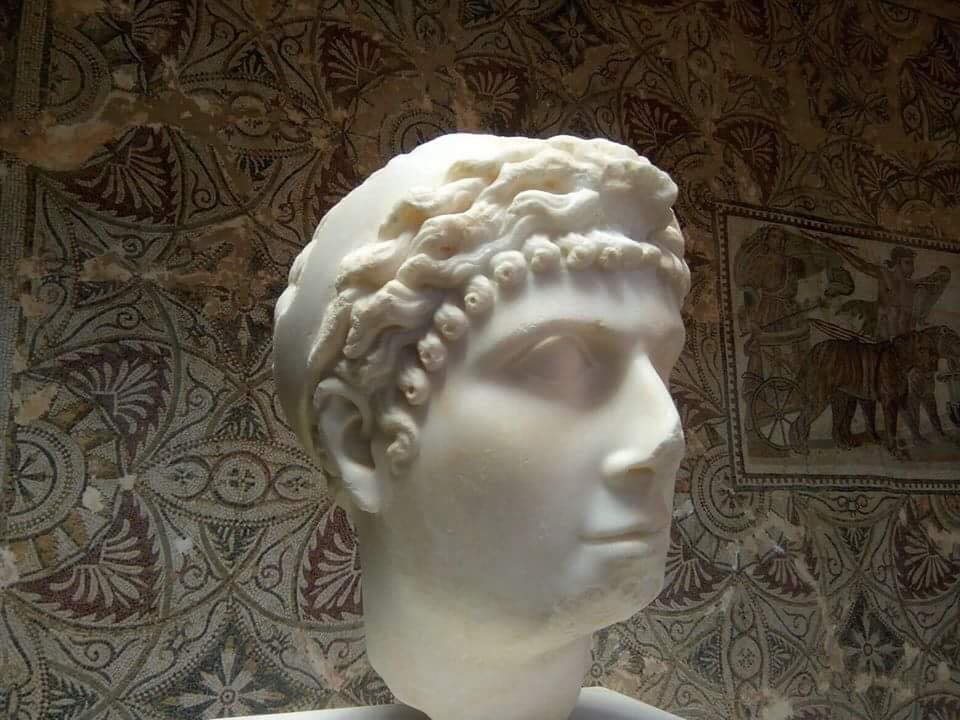
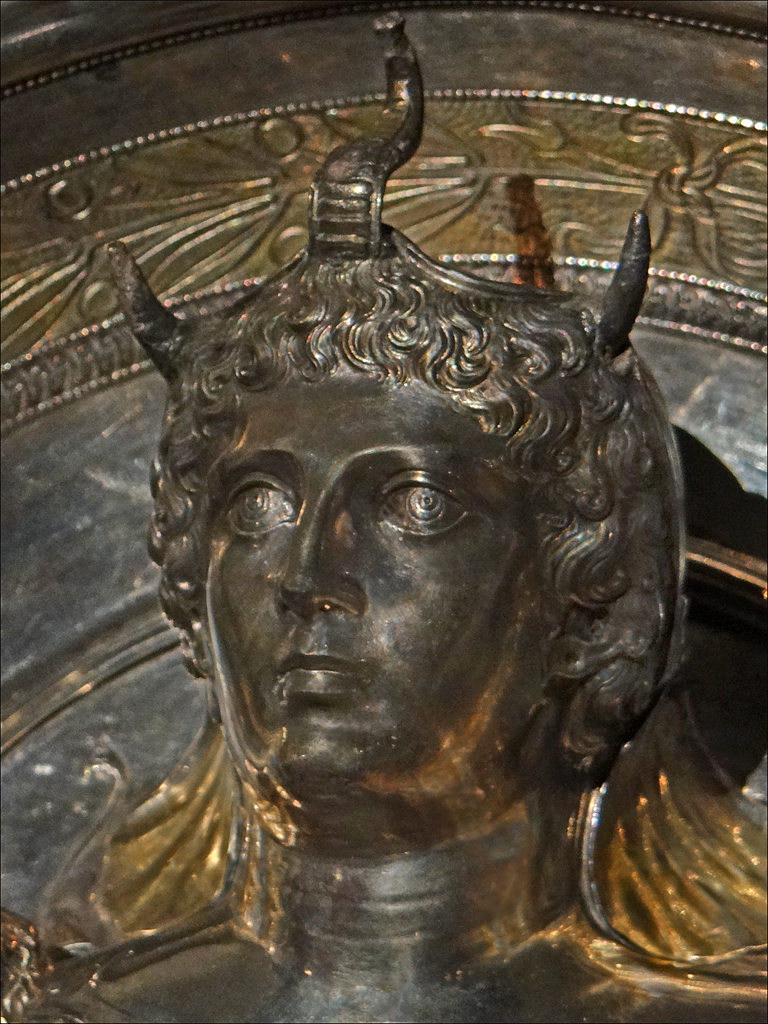
Left: A Roman head of either Cleopatra or her daughter Cleopatra Selene II, Queen of Mauretania, from the late 1st century BC, located in the Archaeological Museum of Cherchell, Algeria
Right: A likely depiction of Cleopatra Selene II, wearing an elephant skin cap, raised relief image on a gilded silver dish from the Boscoreale Treasure, dated to the early 1st century AD (Note: Walker (2001, p. 312) writes the following about the raised relief on the gilded silver dish: "Conspicuously mounted on the cornucopia is a gilded crescent moon set on a pine cone. Around it are piled pomegranates and bunches of grapes. Engraved on the horn are images of Helios (the sun), in the form of a youth dressed in a short cloak, with the hairstyle of Alexander the Great, the head surrounded by rays ... The symbols on the cornucopia can indeed be read as references to the Ptolemaic royal house and specifically to Cleopatra Selene, represented in the crescent moon, and to her twin brother, Alexander Helios, whose eventual fate after the conquest of Egypt is unknown. The viper seems to be linked with the pantheress and the intervening symbols of fecundity rather than the suicide of Cleopatra VII. The elephant scalp could refer to Cleopatra Selene's status as ruler, with Juba II, of Mauretania. The visual correspondence with the veiled head from Cherchel encourages this identification, and many of the symbols used on the dish also appear on the coinage of Juba II.")

After her suicide, Cleopatra's three surviving children, Cleopatra Selene II, Alexander Helios, and Ptolemy Philadelphus, were sent to Rome under the guardianship of Octavian's sister Octavia, a former wife of their father. Cleopatra Selene II and Alexander Helios were present in Octavian's Roman triumph in 29 BC. The fates of Alexander Helios and Ptolemy Philadelphus are unknown after this point. Octavia arranged the betrothal of Cleopatra Selene II to Juba II, son of the Roman client king Juba I of Numidia.

After the wedding of Juba II and Cleopatra Selene II in 25 BC, Emperor Augustus installed them as the new rulers of Mauretania; they made the old Carthaginian city of Iol their capital, renamed Caesarea Mauretaniae (modern Cherchell, Algeria). Cleopatra Selene II imported scholars, artists, and advisers from her mother's royal court in Alexandria to serve her in Caesarea, now permeated in Hellenistic Greek culture. She also named her son Ptolemy in honor of their Ptolemaic dynastic heritage.

Cleopatra Selene II died c. 5 BC, and when Juba II died in 23/24 AD his son Ptolemy succeeded him. The Roman emperor Caligula had Ptolemy executed in 40 AD, perhaps under the pretense that Ptolemy had unlawfully minted his own royal coinage and utilized regalia reserved for the Roman emperor. Ptolemy of Mauretania was the last known monarch of the Ptolemaic dynasty, although the short-reigning 3rd-century Palmyran empress Zenobia claimed descent from Cleopatra. A cult dedicated to Cleopatra still existed as late as 373 AD when Petesenufe, an Egyptian scribe of the book of Isis, explained that he "overlaid the figure of Cleopatra with gold."

=== Roman literature and historiography ===
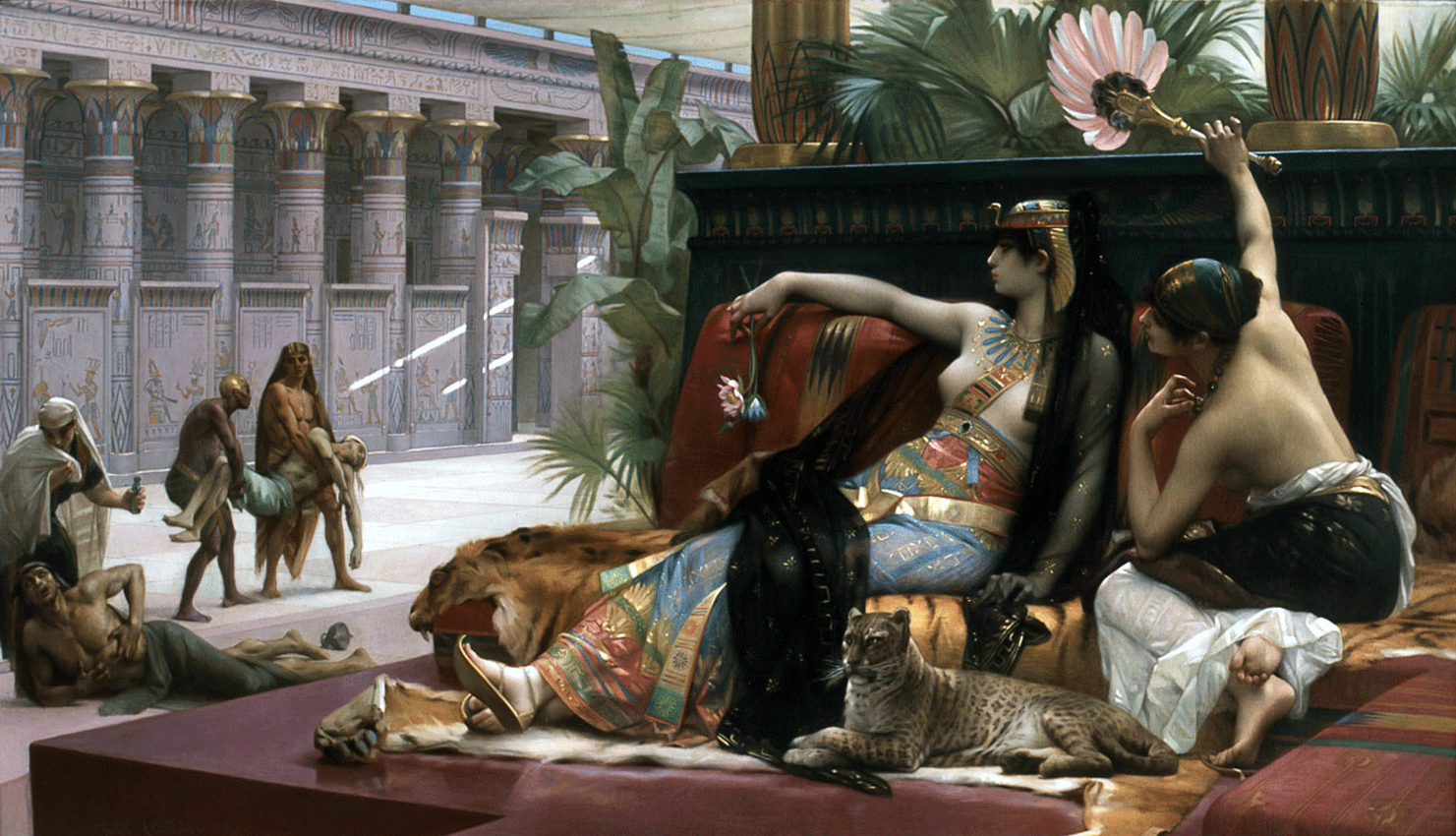
Cleopatra Testing Poisons on Condemned Prisoners (1887), by Alexandre Cabanel

Almost 50 ancient works of Roman historiography mention Cleopatra, often including only terse accounts of the Battle of Actium, her suicide, and Augustan propaganda about her personal deficiencies. The Life of Antonius written by Plutarch in the 1st century AD, although not a biography of Cleopatra, provides the most thorough surviving account of her life. Plutarch relied on primary sources such as Philotas of Amphissa, who had access to the Ptolemaic royal palace, Cleopatra's personal physician Olympos, and Quintus Dellius, a close confidant of Mark Antony and Cleopatra. Plutarch's work included both the Augustan view of Cleopatra—which became canonical for his period—as well as sources outside of this tradition, such as eyewitness reports.

The Jewish Roman historian Josephus, writing in the 1st century AD, provides valuable information on Cleopatra's life via her diplomatic relationship with Herod the Great. However, this work relies largely on Herod's memoirs and the biased account of Nicolaus of Damascus, the tutor of Cleopatra's children in Alexandria who became an adviser and chronicler at Herod's court in Judea. The Roman History published by the official and historian Cassius Dio in the early 3rd century AD, while failing to fully comprehend the complexities of the late Hellenistic world, nevertheless provides a continuous history of Cleopatra's reign.

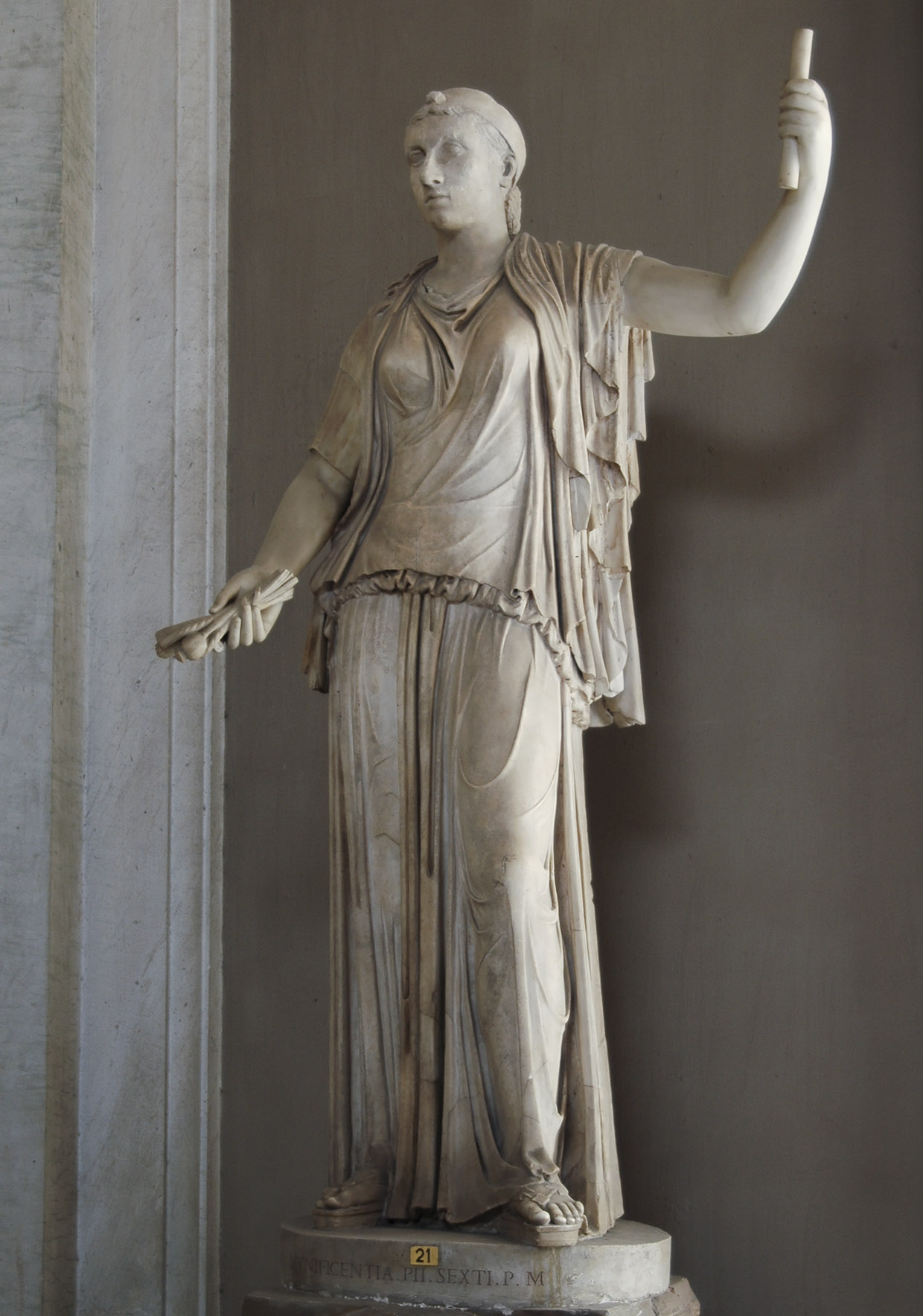
A restructured marble Roman statue of Cleopatra wearing a diadem and 'melon' hairstyle similar to coinage portraits, found along the Via Cassia near the Tomba di Nerone, Rome, and now located in the Museo Pio-Clementino

Cleopatra is barely mentioned in De Bello Alexandrino, the memoirs of an unknown staff officer who served under Caesar. (Note: Jones (2006, p. 60) offers speculation that the author of De Bello Alexandrino, written in Latin prose sometime between 46 and 43 BC, was a certain Aulus Hirtius, a military officer serving under Caesar.) The writings of Cicero, who knew Cleopatra personally, describe her unfavorably. The Augustan-period authors Virgil, Horace, Propertius, and Ovid perpetuated the negative views of Cleopatra approved by the ruling Roman regime, although Virgil established the idea of Cleopatra as a figure of romance and epic melodrama. (Note: Burstein (2004, p. 30) writes that Virgil, in his Aeneid, described the Battle of Actium against Cleopatra "as a clash of civilizations in which Octavian and the Roman gods preserved Italy from conquest by Cleopatra and the barbaric animal-headed gods of Egypt.") Horace also viewed Cleopatra's suicide as a positive choice, an idea that found acceptance by the Late Middle Ages with Geoffrey Chaucer.

The historians Strabo, Velleius, Valerius Maximus, Pliny the Elder, and Appian also provided some details of Cleopatra's life that had not survived in other historical records. (Note: For further information and extracts of Strabo's account of Cleopatra in his Geographica see Jones (2006, pp. 28–30).) Inscriptions on contemporary Ptolemaic coinage and some Egyptian papyrus documents demonstrate Cleopatra's point of view, but this material is very limited in comparison to Roman literary works. (Note: As explained by Chauveau (2000, pp. 2–3), this source material from Egypt dated to the reign of Cleopatra includes about 50 papyri documents in Ancient Greek, mostly from the city of Heracleopolis, and only a few papyri from Faiyum, written in the Demotic Egyptian language. Overall, this is a much smaller body of surviving native texts than those of any other period of Ptolemaic Egypt.) The fragmentary Libyka commissioned by Cleopatra's son-in-law Juba II provides a glimpse at a possible body of historiographic material that supported Cleopatra's perspective.

Cleopatra's gender has perhaps led to her depiction as a minor if not insignificant figure in ancient, medieval, and even modern historiography about ancient Egypt and the Greco-Roman world. For instance, the historian Ronald Syme asserted that she was of little importance to Caesar and that Octavian's propaganda magnified her importance to an excessive degree. Although the common view of Cleopatra was one of a prolific seductress, she had only two known sexual partners, Caesar and Antony, the two most prominent Romans of the time period, who were most likely to ensure the survival of her dynasty. Plutarch described Cleopatra as having had a stronger personality and charming wit than physical beauty. (Note: For the description of Cleopatra by Plutarch, who claimed that her beauty was not "completely incomparable" but that she had a "captivating" and "stimulating" personality, see Jones (2006, pp. 32–33).)

=== Cultural depictions ===
==== Depictions in ancient art ====
===== Statues =====
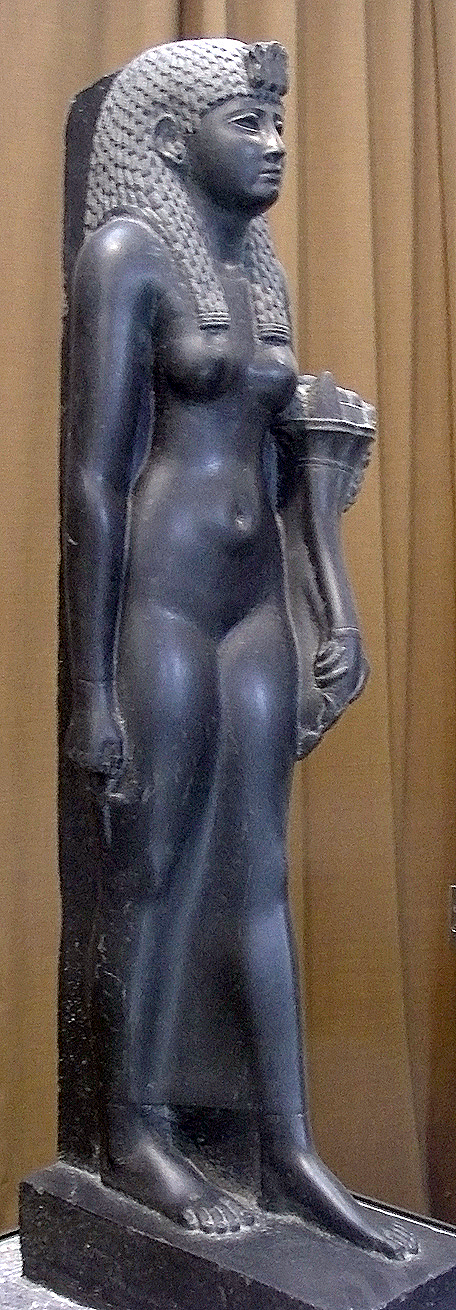
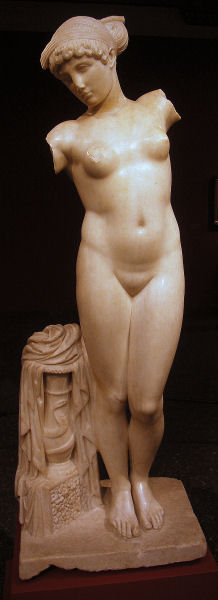
Left: An Egyptian statue of either Arsinoe II or Cleopatra as an Egyptian goddess in black basalt from the second half of the 1st century BC, located in the Hermitage Museum, Saint Petersburg
Right: The Esquiline Venus, a Roman or Hellenistic-Egyptian statue of Venus (Aphrodite) that may be a depiction of Cleopatra, located in the Capitoline Museums, Rome

Cleopatra was depicted in various ancient works of art, in the Egyptian, Hellenistic-Greek, and Roman styles. Surviving works include statues, busts, reliefs, and minted coins, as well as ancient carved cameos, such as one depicting Cleopatra and Antony in Hellenistic style, now in the Altes Museum, Berlin. Contemporary images of Cleopatra were produced both in and outside of Ptolemaic Egypt. For instance, there was once a large gilded bronze statue of Cleopatra inside the Temple of Venus Genetrix in Rome, the first time that a living person had their statue placed next to that of a deity in a Roman temple. Erected there by Caesar, it remained in the temple at least until the 3rd century AD, its preservation perhaps owing to Caesar's patronage. According to Plutarch's Life of Antonius, Augustus tore down Antony's statues but spared those of Cleopatra, thanks to her friend Archibius paying him 2,000 talents. A life-sized Roman-style statue of Cleopatra was found near the Tomba di Nerone, Rome, along the Via Cassia, and is now housed in the Museo Pio-Clementino, part of the Vatican Museums.

Since the 1950s scholars have debated whether the Esquiline Venus is a depiction of Cleopatra, based on its hairstyle and facial features, apparent royal diadem worn over the head, and the uraeus cobra wrapped around the base. The statue was discovered in 1874 on the Esquiline Hill in Rome and is housed in the Palazzo dei Conservatori of the Capitoline Museums. Detractors of this theory argue that this statue's face is thinner than that of the Berlin portrait and assert that it was unlikely she would be depicted as the naked goddess Venus (or the Greek Aphrodite). However, she was depicted in an Egyptian statue as the goddess Isis, while some of her coinage depicts her as Venus-Aphrodite. She also dressed as Aphrodite when meeting Antony at Tarsos. The Esquiline Venus is generally thought to be a mid-1st-century AD Roman copy of a 1st-century BC Greek original from the school of Pasiteles.

===== Coinage portraits =====
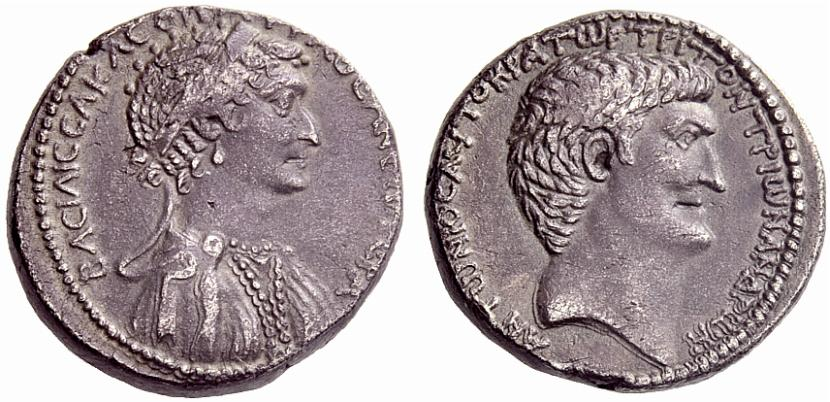
Cleopatra and Mark Antony on the obverse and reverse, respectively, of a silver tetradrachm struck at the Antioch mint in 36 BC, with Greek legends: BACIΛΙCCA KΛΕΟΠΑΤΡΑ ΘΕΑ ΝΕωΤΕΡΑ (Basilissa Kleopatra thea neotera – Queen Cleopatra younger goddess), ANTωNIOC AYTOKPATωP TPITON TPIωN ANΔPωN (Antonios autokrator triton trion andron – Antony imperator for the third time triumvir)

Surviving coinage of Cleopatra's reign includes specimens from every regnal year, from 51 to 30 BC. Cleopatra, the only Ptolemaic queen to issue coins on her own behalf, almost certainly inspired her partner Caesar to become the first living Roman to portray himself on his own coins. (Note: Fletcher (2008, p. 205) writes the following: "Cleopatra was the only female Ptolemy to issue coins on her own behalf, some showing her as Venus-Aphrodite. Caesar now followed her example and, taking the same bold step, became the first living Roman to appear on coins, his rather haggard profile accompanied by the title 'Parens Patriae', 'Father of the Fatherland'.") Cleopatra was the first foreign queen featured on Roman currency. Coins dated to the period of her marriage to Antony, which also bear his image, portray the queen as having a very similar aquiline nose and prominent chin as that of her husband. These similar facial features followed an artistic convention that represented the mutually-observed harmony of a royal couple.

Cleopatra's strong, almost masculine facial features in these particular coins differ from the smoother, softer, and perhaps idealized sculpted images of her in either the Egyptian or Hellenistic styles. Her masculine facial features on minted currency are similar to those of her father, Ptolemy XII Auletes, earlier Egyptian queens, and perhaps her ancestor Arsinoe II (316–260 BC). Due to political expediency, Antony's visage was likely made to conform not only to Cleopatra's but also to those of her Macedonian Greek ancestors who founded the Ptolemaic dynasty, to familiarize himself to her subjects as a legitimate member of the royal house.

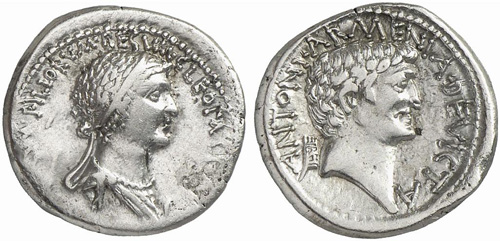
Cleopatra and Mark Antony. Silver denarius, 32 BC, Obverse: CLEOPATRA E REGINAE REGVM FILIORVM REGVM, bust of Cleopatra left, Reverse: ANTONI ARMENIA DEVICTA, Head of Mark Antony right.

The inscriptions on the coins are written in Greek, but also in the circular lettering and nominative case of Roman coins rather than the genitive case and linear arrangement of Greek coins. These facets of Cleopatra and Antony's coinage represent the synthesis of Roman and Hellenistic culture, and perhaps also a now unclear statement to their subjects about the superiority of either one over the other. Diana Kleiner argues that Cleopatra, in one of her coins minted with the dual image of her husband Antony, made herself more masculine-looking than other portraits and more like an acceptable Roman client queen than a Hellenistic ruler. Cleopatra had used this masculine look in coinage predating her affair with Antony, such as the coins struck at the Ascalon mint during her brief period of exile to Syria and the Levant, which Joann Fletcher explains as her attempt to appear like her father and as a legitimate successor to a male Ptolemaic ruler.

Various coins, such as a silver tetradrachm minted some time after Cleopatra's marriage with Antony in 37 BC, depict her wearing a royal diadem and a 'melon' hairstyle. Two surviving sculpted marble heads also feature this hairstyle and diadem. (Note: For further information, see Raia & Sebesta (2017).) This hairstyle, with hair braided back into a bun, is the same as that worn by her Ptolemaic ancestors Arsinoe II and Berenice II in their coinage. After Cleopatra visited Rome in 46–44 BC, it became fashionable for Roman women to adopt it as one of their hairstyles, but it was abandoned for a more modest, austere look during the conservative rule of Augustus.

===== Greco-Roman busts and heads =====
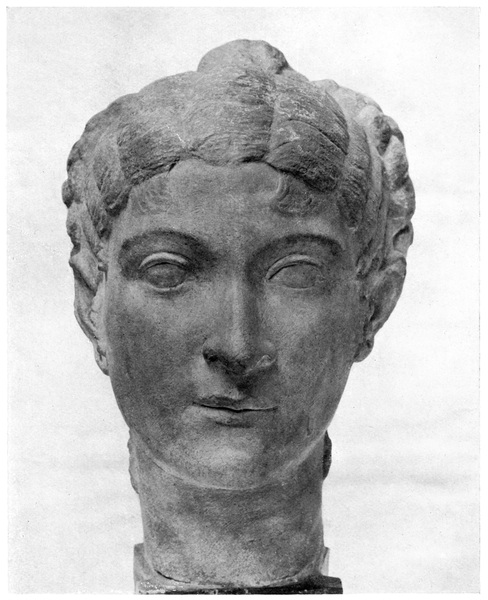
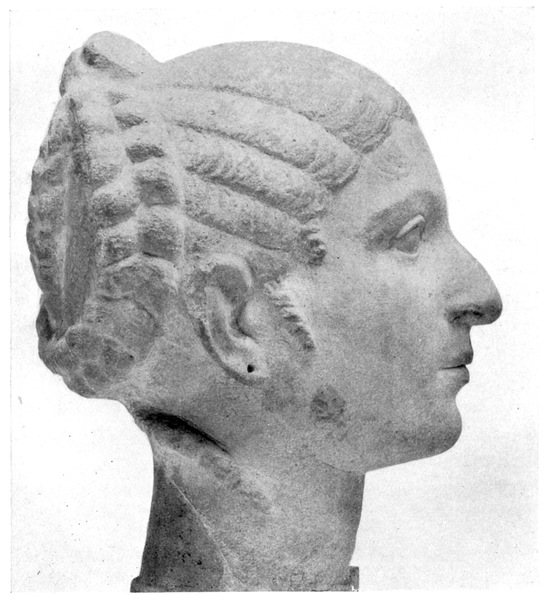
An ancient Roman portrait head, c. 50–30 BC, now located in the British Museum, London, that depicts a woman from Ptolemaic Egypt, either Queen Cleopatra or a member of her entourage during her 46–44 BC visit to Rome with her lover Julius Caesar

Of the surviving Greco-Roman-style busts and heads of Cleopatra, (Note: There is academic disagreement on whether the following portraits are considered "heads" or "busts". For instance, Raia & Sebesta (2017) exclusively uses the former, while Grout (2017b) prefers the latter.) the sculpture known as the "Berlin Cleopatra", located in the Altes Museum ancient history collection, possesses her full nose, whereas the head known as the "Vatican Cleopatra", located in the Vatican Museums, is damaged with a missing nose. (Note: For further information and validation, see Curtius (1933, pp. 182–192), Walker (2008, p. 348), Raia & Sebesta (2017) and Grout (2017b).) Both scupltures have royal diadems, similar facial features, and perhaps once resembled the face of her bronze statue housed in the Temple of Venus Genetrix. (Note: For further information and validation, see Grout (2017b) and Roller (2010, pp. 174–175).) Both are dated to the mid-1st century BC and were found in Roman villas along the Via Appia in Italy. (Note: For further information, see Curtius (1933, pp. 182–192), Walker (2008, p. 348) and Raia & Sebesta (2017).) Francisco Pina Polo writes that Cleopatra's coinage present her image with certainty and asserts that the sculpted portrait of the Berlin head is confirmed as having a similar profile with her hair pulled back into a bun, a diadem, and a hooked nose. (Note: Blaise Pascal remarked in his Pensées (1670): "Cleopatra's nose: had it been shorter, the whole aspect of the world would have been altered." (Pascal 1910, sec. II, no. 162) According to (Perry & Williams 2019), a less aquiline nose would have diminished her chances of becoming ruler of Egypt and attract men of the First and Second Triumvirate, which would have changed the Battle of Actium, and subsequent European history.)

A third sculpted portrait of Cleopatra accepted by scholars as being authentic survives at the Archaeological Museum of Cherchell, Algeria. This portrait features the royal diadem and similar facial features as the Berlin and Vatican heads, but has a more unique hairstyle and may depict her daughter Cleopatra Selene II. The Capitoline Museums host a possible Parian-marble sculpture of Cleopatra wearing a vulture headdress in Egyptian style. Discovered near a sanctuary of Isis in Rome and dated to the 1st century BC, it is either Roman or Hellenistic-Egyptian in origin.

Other possible sculpted depictions of Cleopatra include one in the British Museum, London, made of limestone, which perhaps only depicts a woman in her entourage during her trip to Rome. The woman in this portrait has facial features similar to others (including the pronounced aquiline nose), but lacks a royal diadem and sports a different hairstyle. However, the British Museum head, once belonging to a full statue, could represent Cleopatra at a different stage in her life and may also indicate her effort to discard the use of royal insignia (i.e. the diadem) to make herself more appealing to the citizens of Republican Rome. Duane W. Roller speculates that the British Museum head, along with those in the Egyptian Museum, Cairo, the Capitoline Museums, and in the private collection of Maurice Nahmen, most likely represent members of the royal court or even Roman women imitating Cleopatra's popular hairstyle.

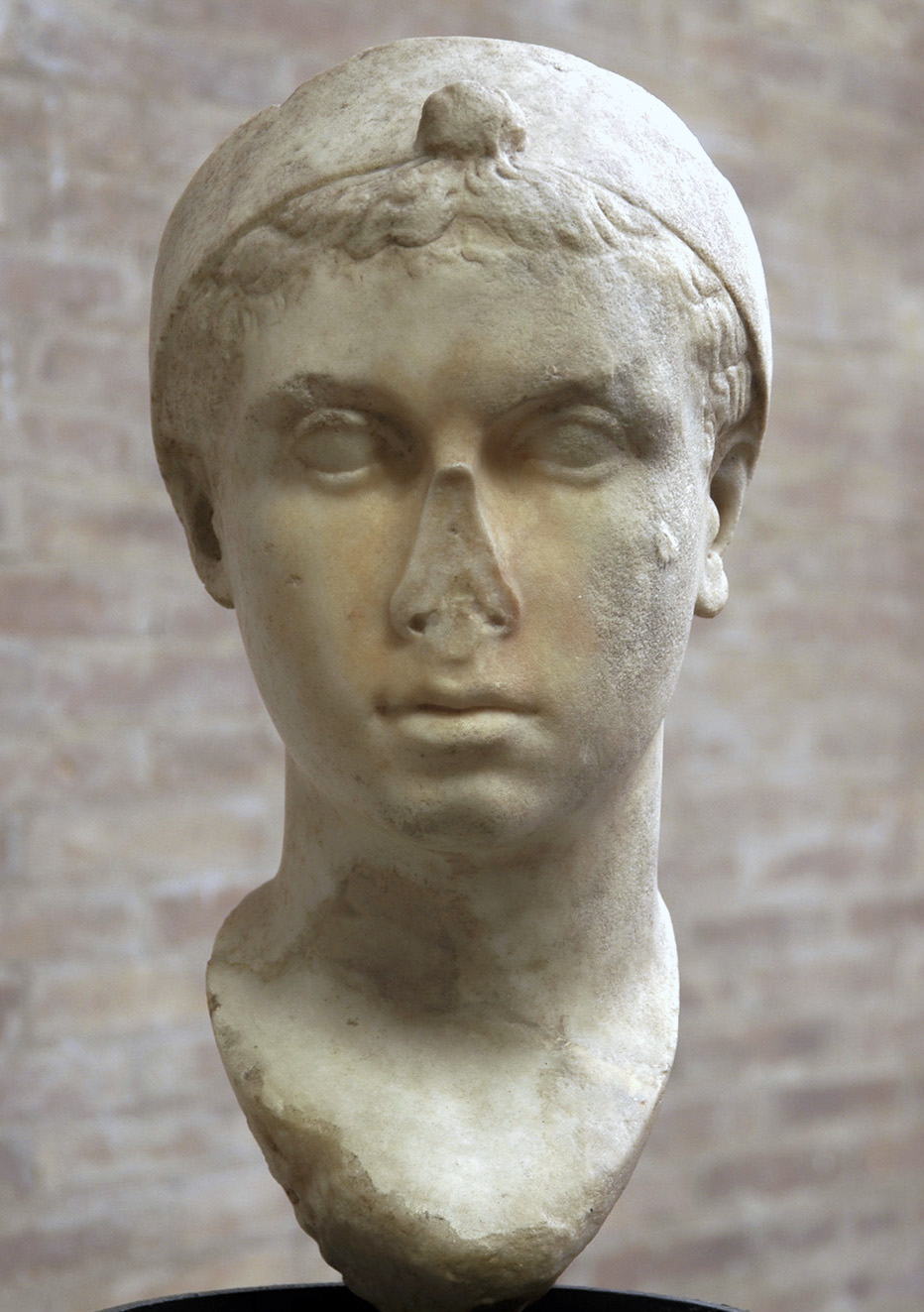
Cleopatra, mid-1st century BC, with a "melon" hairstyle and Hellenistic royal diadem worn over her head, now in the Vatican Museums

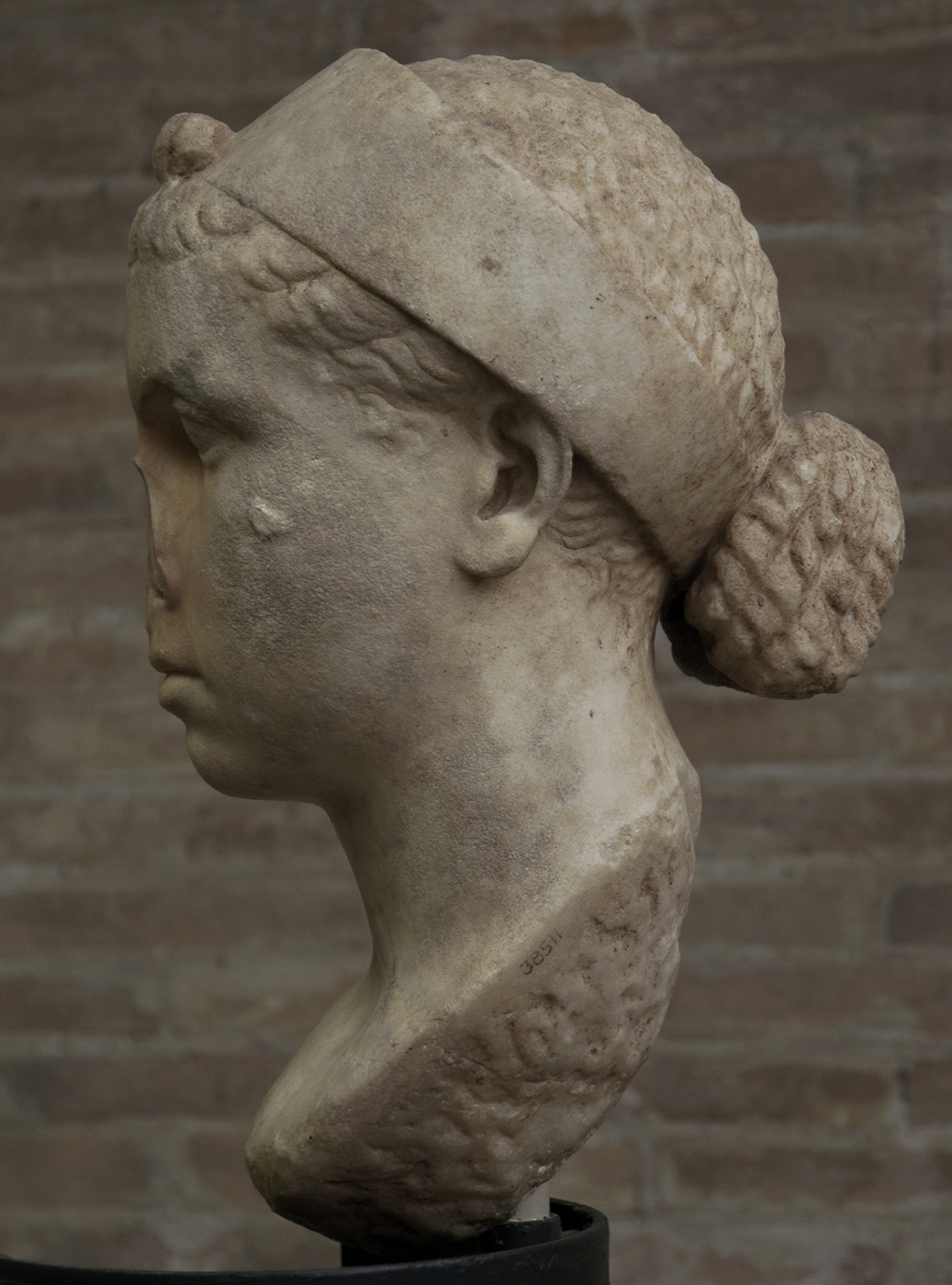
Profile view of the Vatican Cleopatra

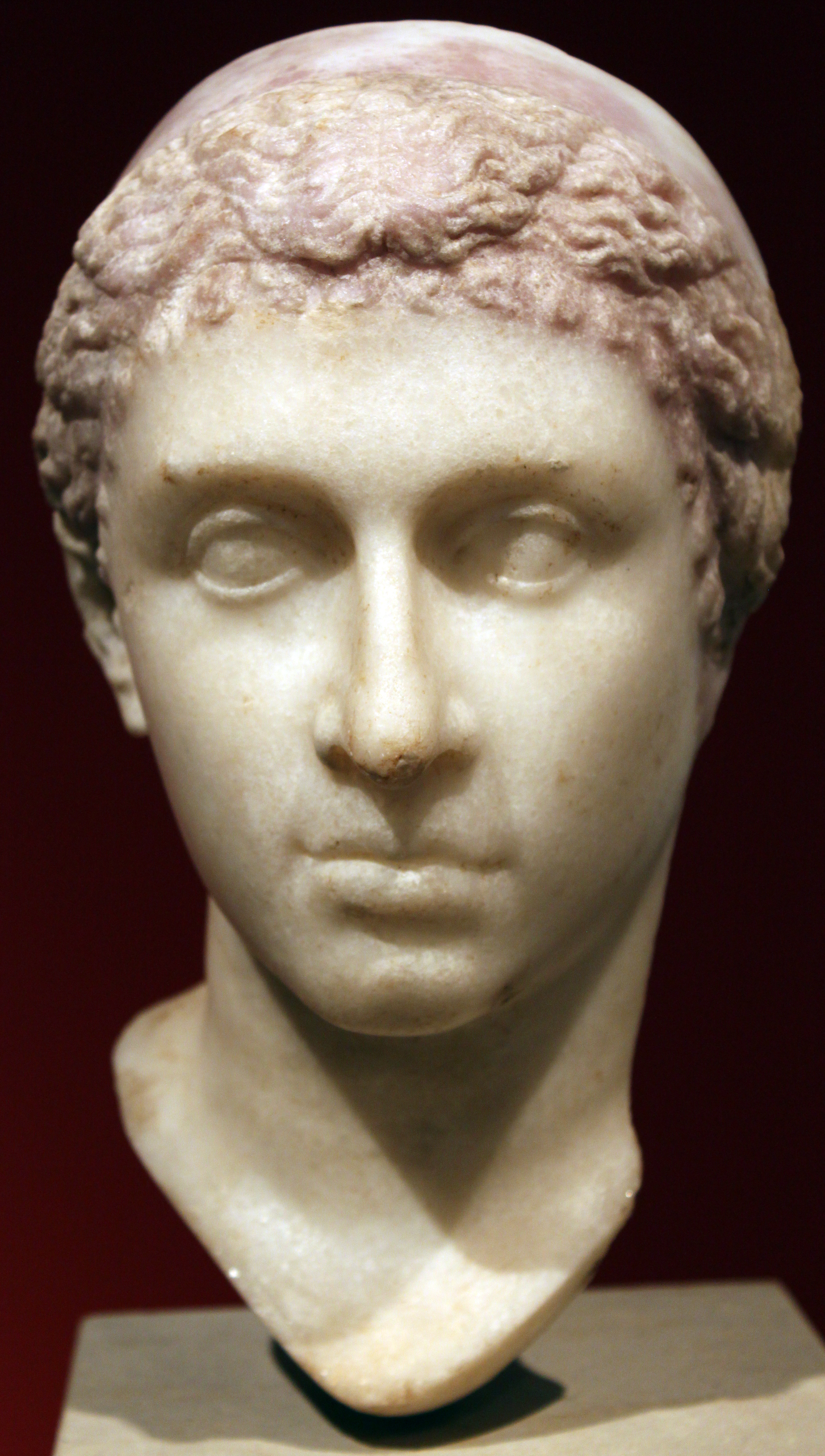
Cleopatra, mid-1st century BC, showing Cleopatra with a "melon" hairstyle and Hellenistic royal diadem worn over the head, now in the Altes Museum

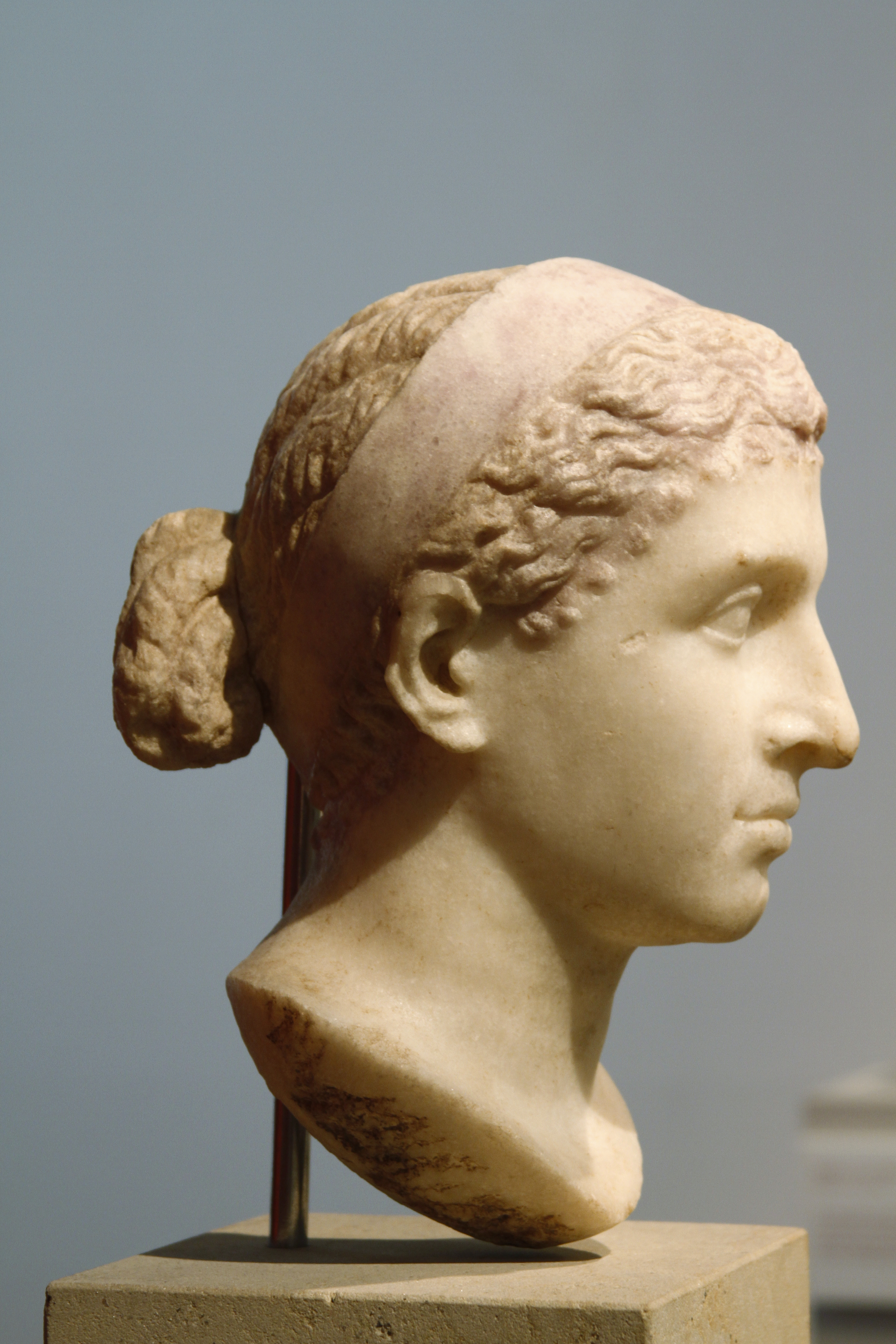
Profile view of the Berlin Cleopatra

===== Paintings =====
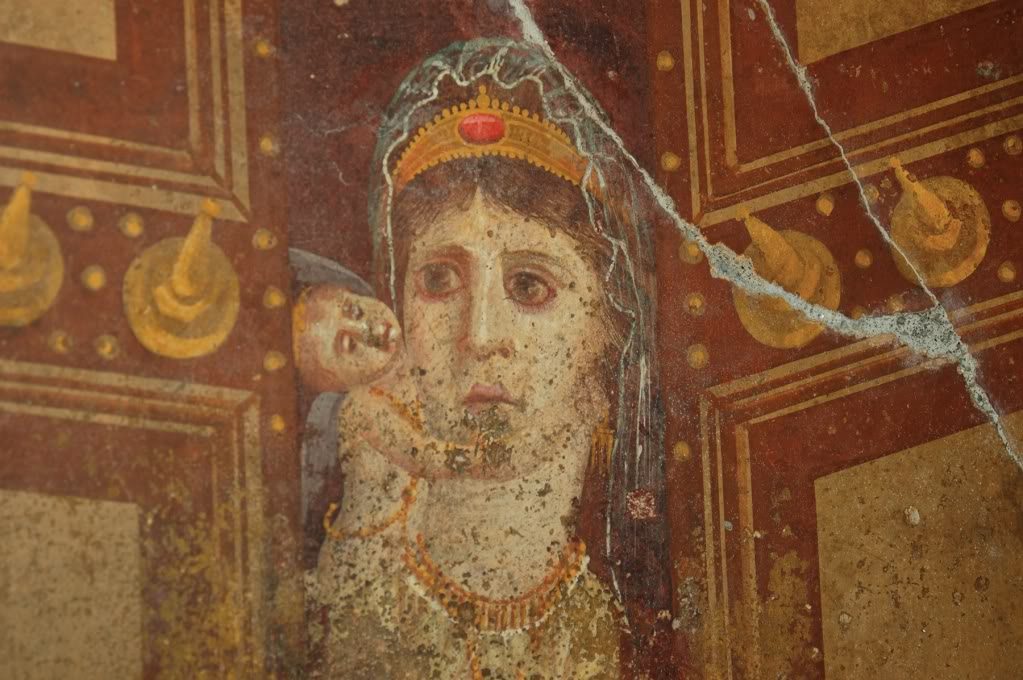
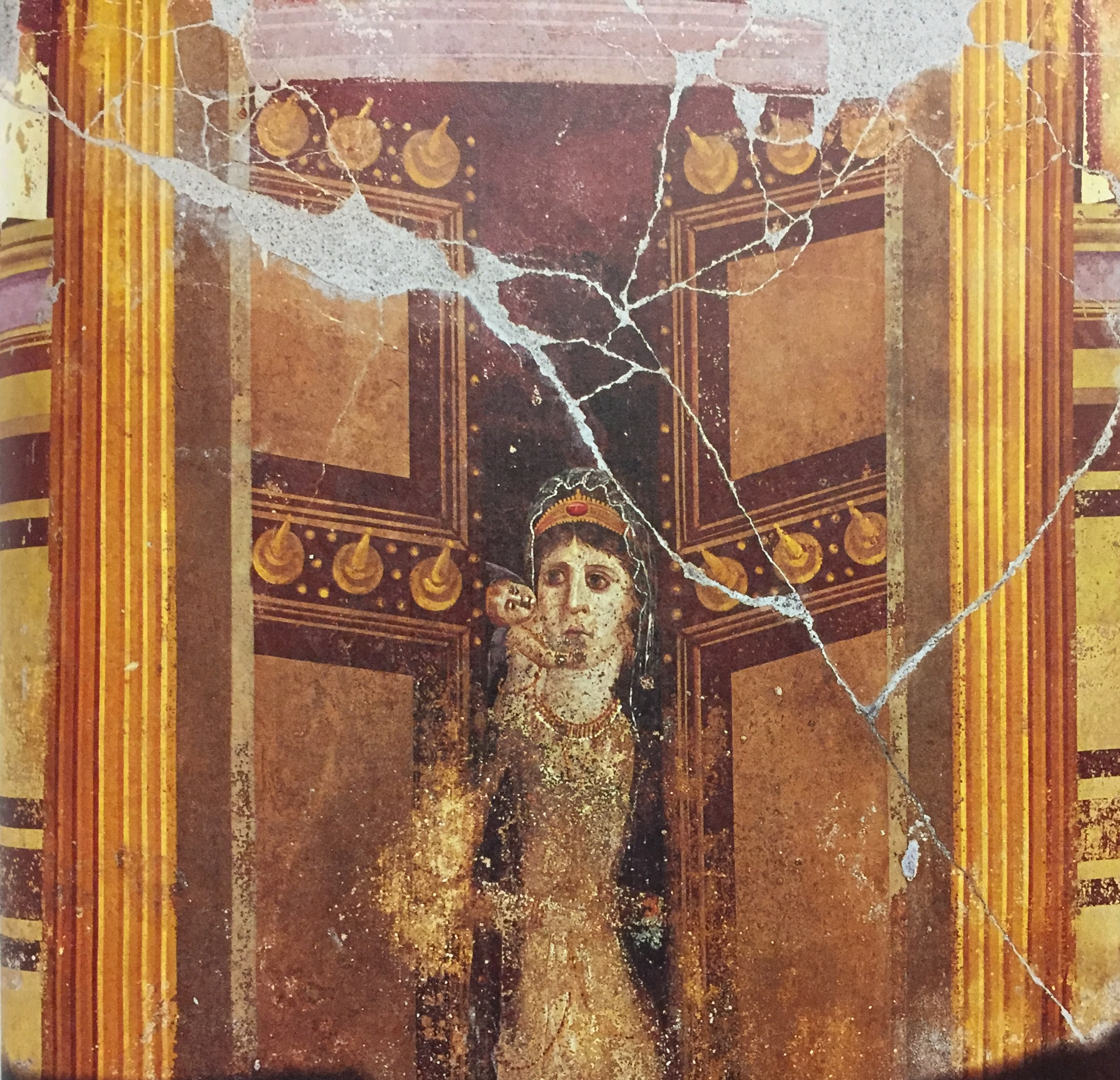
A Roman Second Style painting in the House of Marcus Fabius Rufus at Pompeii, Italy, depicting Cleopatra as Venus Genetrix and her son Caesarion as a cupid, mid-1st century BC

In the House of Marcus Fabius Rufus at Pompeii, Italy, a mid-1st century BC Second Style wall painting of the goddess Venus holding a cupid near massive temple doors is probably a depiction of Cleopatra as Venus Genetrix with her son Caesarion. The commission of the painting most likely coincides with the erection of the Temple of Venus Genetrix in the Forum of Caesar in September 46 BC, where Caesar had a gilded statue erected depicting Cleopatra. This statue likely formed the basis of her depictions in both sculpted art as well as a painting at Pompeii. The woman in the painting wears a royal diadem and is similar in appearance to the Vatican Cleopatra, which bears possible marks on the marble of its left cheek where a cupid's arm may have been torn off. (Note: The observation that the left cheek of the Vatican Cleopatra once had a cupid's hand that was broken off was first suggested by Ludwig Curtius in 1933. Kleiner concurs with this assessment. See Kleiner (2005, p. 153), as well as Walker (2008, p. 40) and Curtius (1933, pp. 182–192). While Kleiner (2005, p. 153) has suggested the lump on top of this marble head perhaps contained a broken-off uraeus, Curtius (1933, p. 187) offered the explanation that it once held a sculpted representation of a jewel.) The room with the painting was walled off by its owner, perhaps following Caesarion's execution in 30 BC, when the new Roman regime would have viewed his public depictions unfavorably.

Behind the woman's golden diadem, crowned with a red jewel, is a translucent veil with crinkles that suggest Cleopatra's favored "melon" hairstyle. (Note: Curtius (1933, p. 187) wrote that the damaged lump along the hairline and diadem of the Vatican Cleopatra likely contained a sculpted representation of a jewel, which Walker (2008, p. 40) directly compares to the painted red jewel in the diadem worn by Venus, most likely Cleopatra, in the fresco from Pompeii.) Her ivory-white skin, round face, long aquiline nose, and large round eyes were features common in both Roman and Ptolemaic depictions of deities. Roller affirms that "there seems little doubt that this is a depiction of Cleopatra and Caesarion before the doors of the Temple of Venus in the Forum Julium and, as such, it becomes the only extant contemporary painting of the queen."

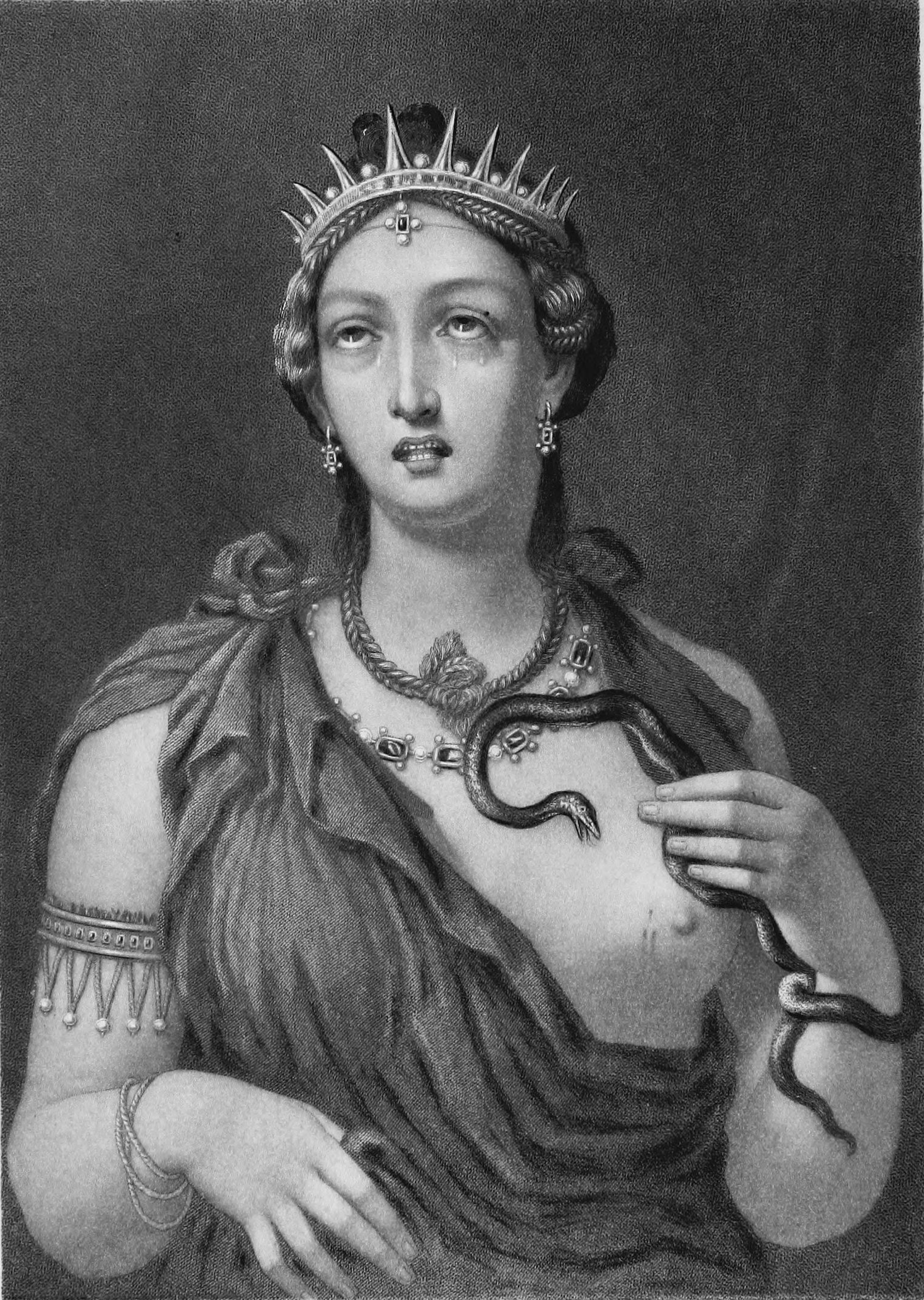
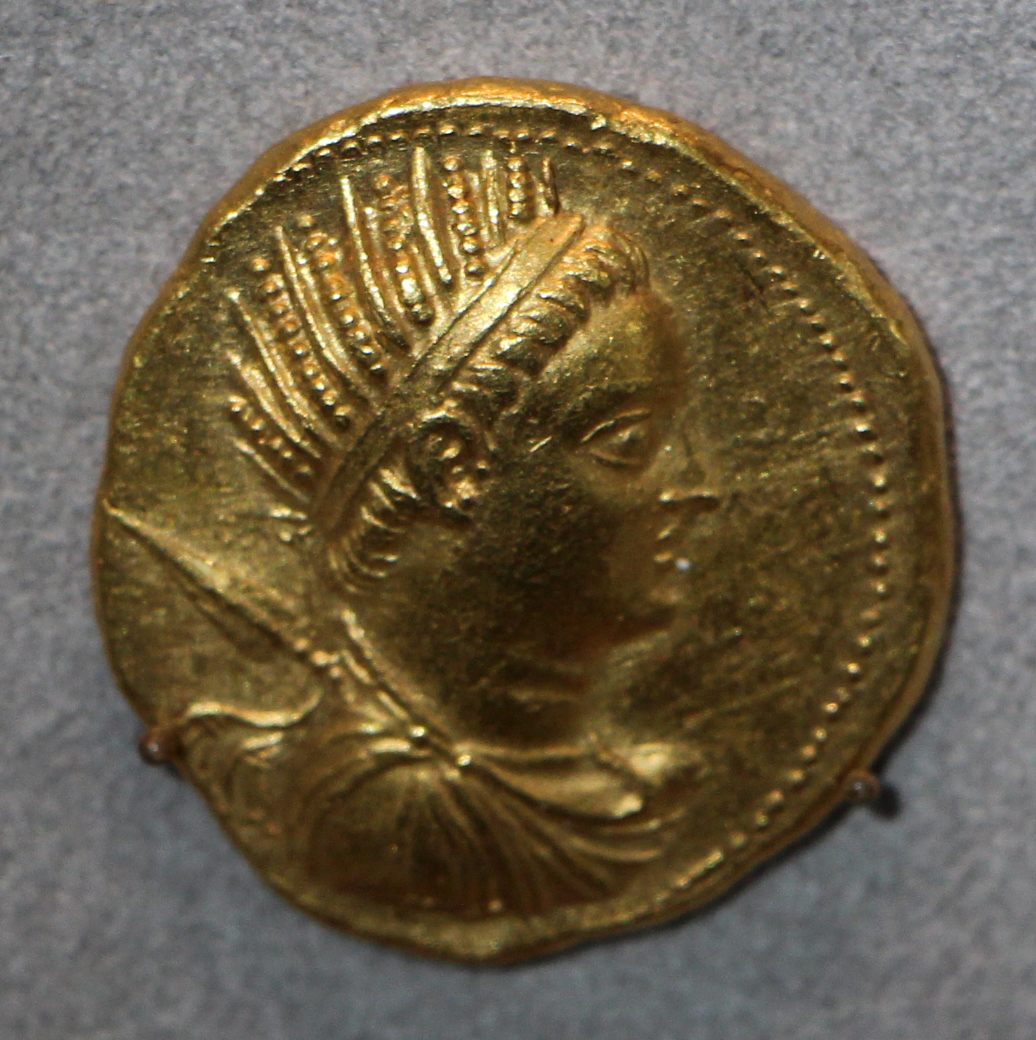
A steel engraving published by John Sartain in 1885 (left) depicting the now lost painted death portrait of Cleopatra, an encaustic painting discovered in 1818 in the ancient Roman ruins of the Egyptian temple of Serapis at Hadrian's Villa in Tivoli, Lazio; she is seen here wearing the knotted garment of Isis (corresponding with Plutarch's description of her wearing the robes of Isis), as well as the radiant crown of the Ptolemaic rulers such as Ptolemy V (pictured to the right in a golden octodrachm minted in 204–203 BC).

Another painting from Pompeii, dated to the early 1st century AD and located in the House of Giuseppe II, contains a possible depiction of Cleopatra and Caesarion, both wearing royal diadems while she reclines and consumes poison in an act of suicide. (Note: For further information about the painting in the House of Giuseppe II (Joseph II) at Pompeii and the possible identification of Cleopatra as one of the figures, see Pucci (2011, pp. 206–207, footnote 27).) The painting was originally thought to depict the Carthaginian noblewoman Sophonisba, who, toward the end of the Second Punic War (218–201 BC), drank poison and committed suicide at the behest of her lover, King Masinissa of Numidia. Arguments in favor of it depicting Cleopatra include the strong connection of the Ptolemaic and Numidian royal families, Masinissa and Ptolemy VIII Physcon having been associates and Cleopatra's daughter marrying the Numidian prince Juba II.

Sophonisba was a more obscure figure when the painting was made, while Cleopatra's suicide was far more famous. An asp is absent from the painting, but many Romans held the view that she received poison in another manner than a venomous snakebite. A set of double doors on the rear wall of the painting, positioned very high above the people in it, suggests the described layout of Cleopatra's tomb in Alexandria. A male servant holds the mouth of an artificial Egyptian crocodile, while another man standing by is dressed as a Roman.

In 1818, a now lost encaustic painting was discovered in the Temple of Serapis at Hadrian's Villa, near Tivoli, Lazio, Italy, that depicted Cleopatra committing suicide with an asp biting her bare chest. A chemical analysis performed in 1822 confirmed that the medium for the painting was composed of one-third wax and two-thirds resin. The thickness of the painting over Cleopatra's bare flesh and her drapery was reportedly similar to the paintings of the Fayum mummy portraits. A steel engraving published by John Sartain in 1885 depicting the painting as described in the archaeological report shows Cleopatra wearing authentic Hellenistic Egyptian clothing and jewelry, as well as the radiant crown of the Ptolemaic rulers. After Cleopatra's suicide, Octavian commissioned a painting of her depicting a snake biting her. He paraded this image in her stead during his triumphal procession in Rome. This painting was perhaps among the great number of artworks and treasures taken from Rome by Emperor Hadrian to decorate his private villa, where it was found in an Egyptian temple. (Note: In Pratt & Fizel (1949, pp. 14–15), Frances Pratt and Becca Fizel rejected the idea proposed by some scholars in the 19th and early 20th centuries that the painting was perhaps done by an artist of the Italian Renaissance. Pratt and Fizel highlighted the Classical style of the painting as preserved in textual descriptions and the steel engraving. They argued that it was unlikely for a Renaissance period painter to have created works with encaustic materials, conducted thorough research into Hellenistic period Egyptian clothing and jewelry as depicted in the painting, and then precariously placed it in the ruins of the Egyptian temple at Hadrian's Villa.)

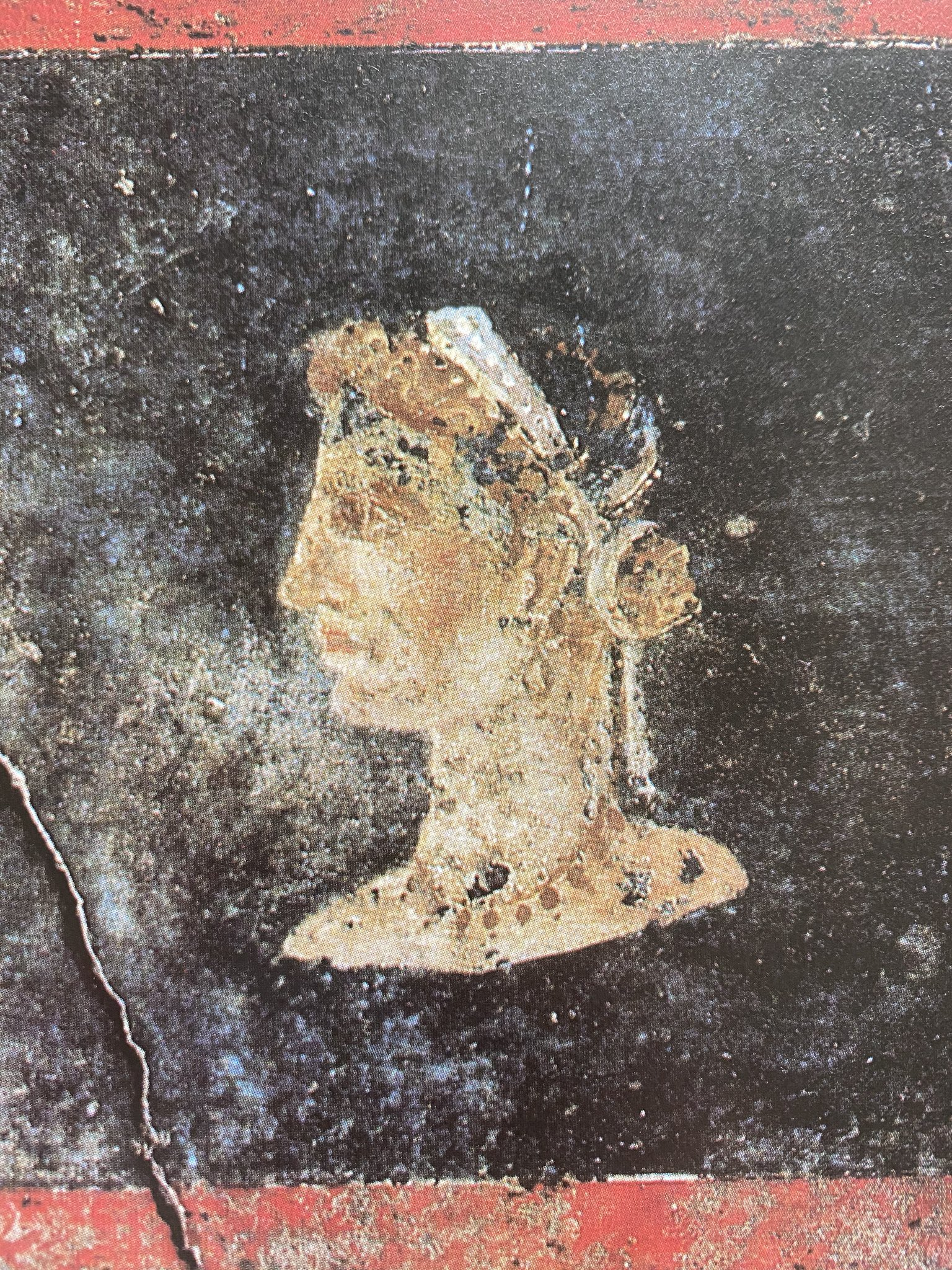
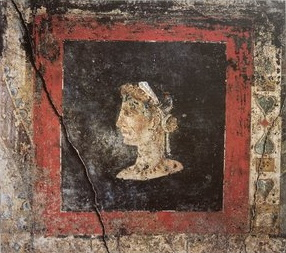
An ancient Roman fresco in the Pompeian Third Style possibly depicting Cleopatra, from the House of the Orchard at Pompeii, Italy, mid-1st century AD

A Roman panel painting from Herculaneum, Italy, dated to the 1st century AD possibly depicts Cleopatra. In it she wears a royal diadem, red or reddish-brown hair pulled back into a bun, (Note: Walker & Higgs (2001, pp. 314–315) describe her hair as reddish brown, while Fletcher (2008, p. 87) describes her as a flame-haired redhead and, in Fletcher (2008, image plates and captions between pp. 246–247), likewise describes her as a red-haired woman.) pearl-studded hairpins, and earrings with ball-shaped pendants, the white skin of her face and neck set against a stark black background. Her hair and facial features are similar to those in the sculpted Berlin and Vatican portraits as well as her coinage. The same artist may have created a similar painted bust of a woman with a blue headband in the House of the Orchard at Pompeii featuring Egyptian-style imagery, such as a Greek-style sphinx.

===== Portland Vase =====
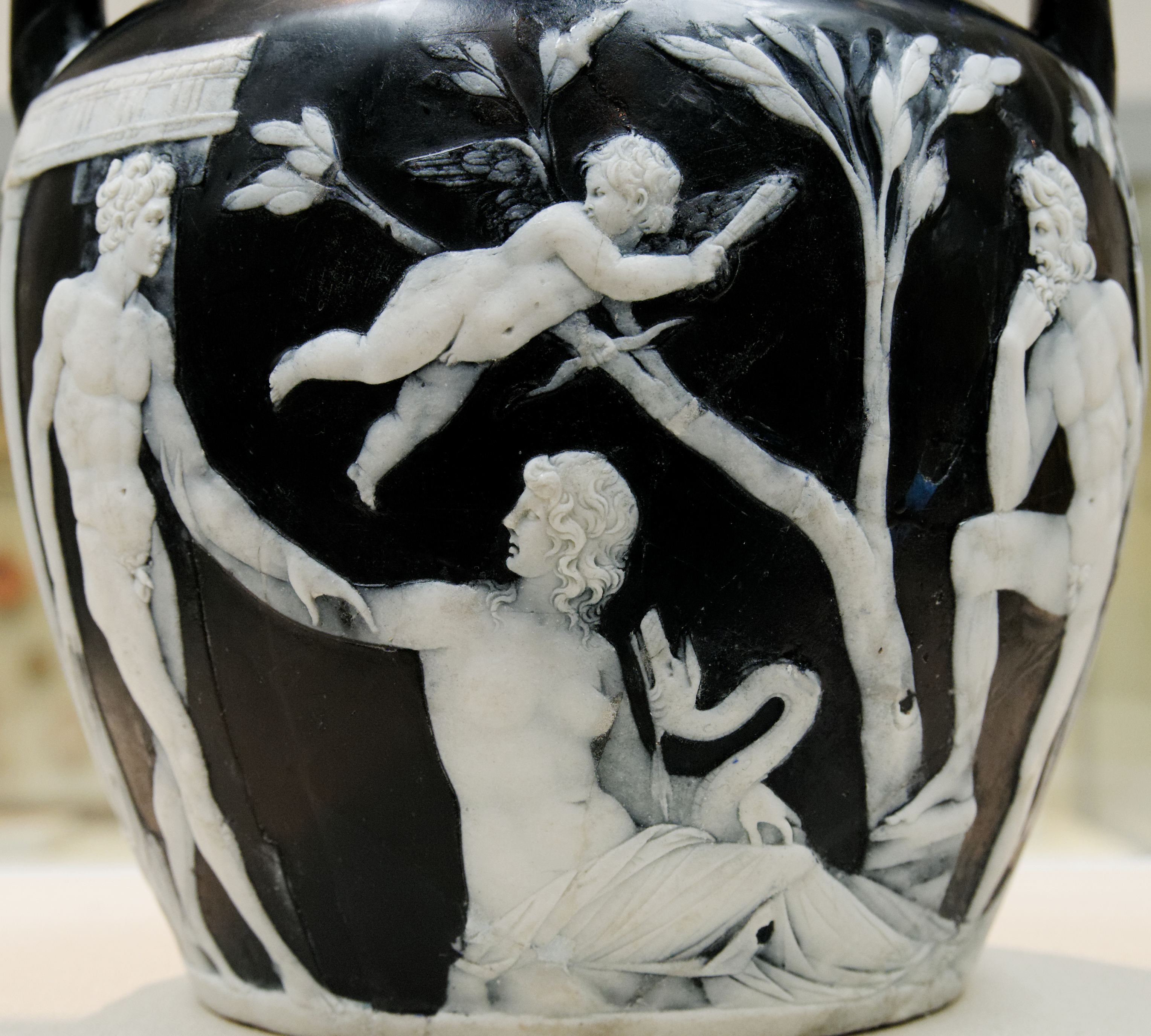
A possible depiction of Mark Antony on the Portland Vase being lured by Cleopatra, straddling a serpent, while Anton, Antony's alleged ancestor, looks on and Eros flies above

The Portland Vase, a Roman cameo glass vase dated to the Augustan period and now in the British Museum, includes a possible depiction of Cleopatra with Antony. In this interpretation, Cleopatra can be seen grasping Antony and drawing him toward her while a serpent (i.e. the asp) rises between her legs, Eros floats above, and Antony's alleged ancestor Anton looks on in despair as his descendant is led to his doom. The other side of the vase perhaps contains a scene of Octavia, abandoned by her husband Antony but watched over by her brother Augustus. The vase would thus have been created after 35 BC, when Antony sent Octavia back to Italy and stayed with Cleopatra in Alexandria.

===== Native Egyptian art =====
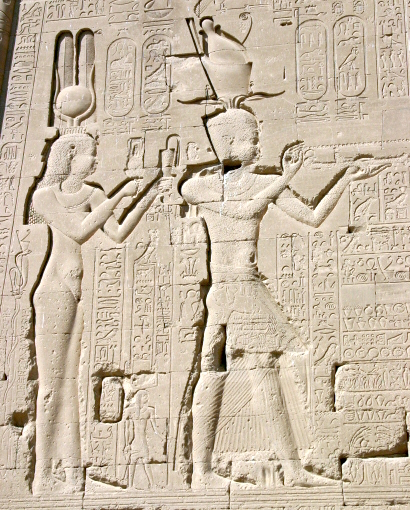
A carved relief of Cleopatra and her son Caesarion at the Temple of Dendera, Egypt, 1st century BC

The Bust of Cleopatra in the Royal Ontario Museum represents the queen in the Egyptian style. Dated to the mid-1st century BC, it is perhaps the earliest depiction of her as both a goddess and ruling pharaoh. The sculpture has pronounced eyes that share similarities with Roman copies of Ptolemaic sculpted works of art. The Dendera Temple complex, near Dendera, Egypt, contains Egyptian-style carved relief images along the exterior walls of the Temple of Hathor depicting Cleopatra and her young son Caesarion as a grown adult and ruling pharaoh making offerings to the gods. Augustus had his name inscribed there following Cleopatra's death.

A large Ptolemaic black basalt statue measuring 104 centimeters (41 in) in height, now in the Hermitage Museum, Saint Petersburg, is thought to represent Pharaoh Arsinoe II, but recent analysis has indicated that it could depict her descendant Cleopatra due to the three uraei adorning her headdress, an increase from the two Arsinoe II used to symbolize her rule over Lower and Upper Egypt. The woman in the basalt statue also holds a divided, double cornucopia (dikeras), which can be seen on coins of both Arsinoe and Cleopatra. In his Kleopatra und die Caesaren (2006), Bernard Andreae contends that this basalt statue, like other idealized Egyptian portraits of Cleopatra, does not contain realistic facial features and hence adds little to the knowledge of her appearance. (Note: Preston (2009, p. 305) comes to a similar conclusion about native Egyptian depictions of Cleopatra: "Apart from certain temple carvings, which are anyway in a highly stylised pharaonic style and give little clue to Cleopatra's real appearance, the only certain representations of Cleopatra are those on coins. The marble head in the Vatican is one of three sculptures generally, though not universally, accepted by scholars to be depictions of Cleopatra.") Adrian Goldsworthy writes that Cleopatra would have dressed as a native only "perhaps for certain rites" and instead would usually dress as a Greek monarch, which would include the Greek headband seen in her Greco-Roman busts.

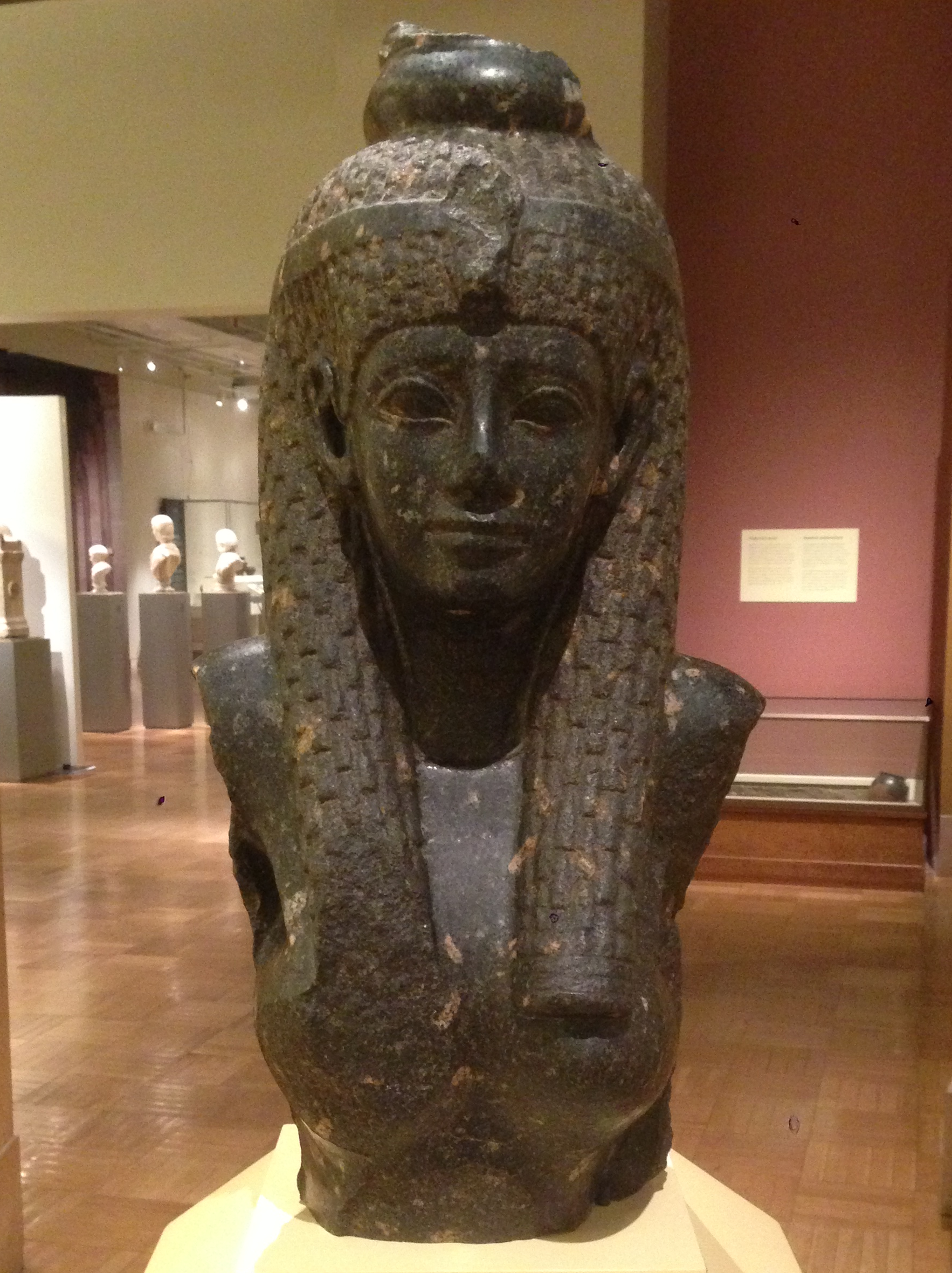
A granite Egyptian bust of Cleopatra from the Royal Ontario Museum, mid-1st century BC

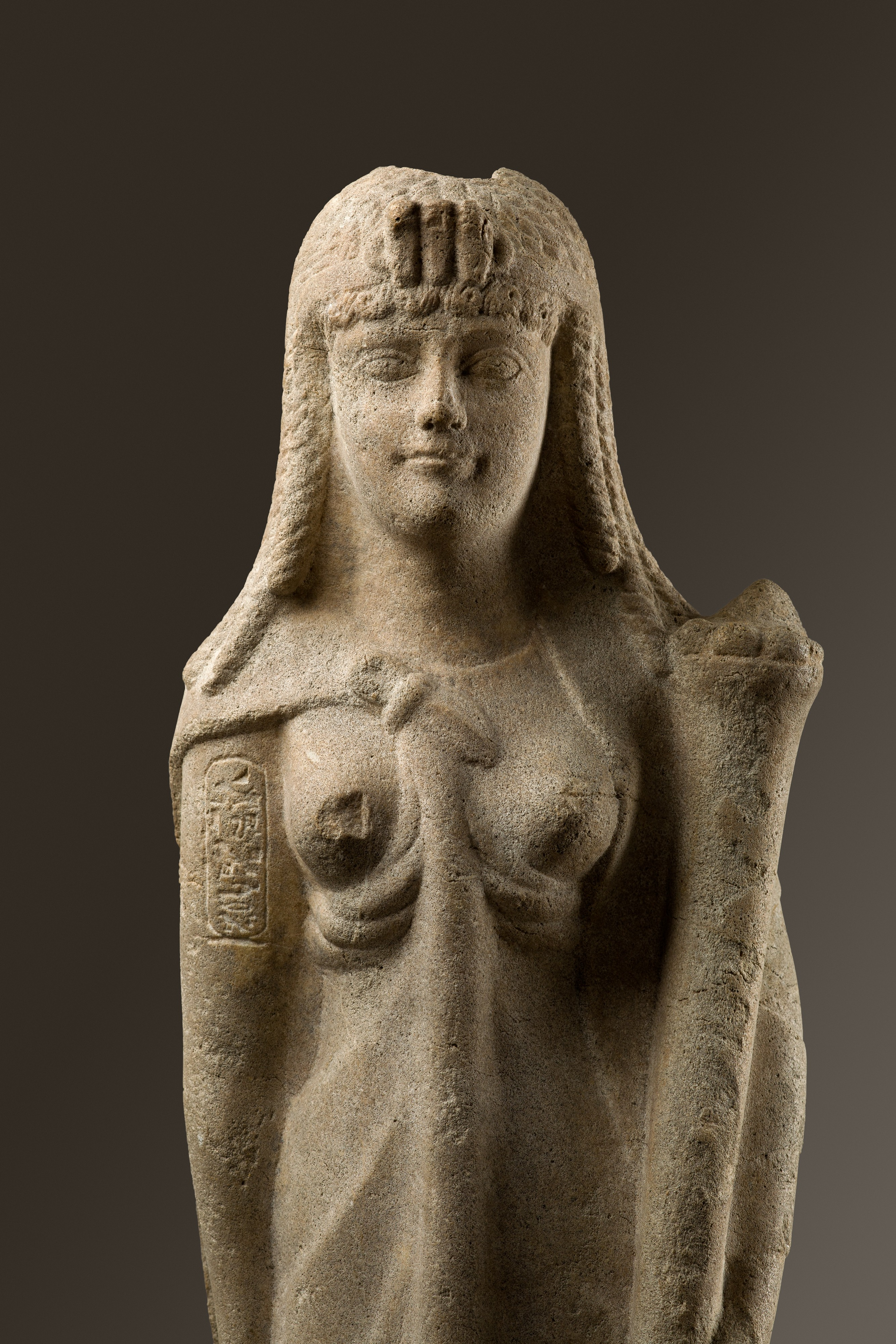
A marble statue of Cleopatra with her cartouche inscribed on the upper right arm and wearing a diadem with a triple uraeus, from the Metropolitan Museum of Art

Possible sculpted head of Cleopatra VII in the form of Isis, wearing an Egyptian-style vulture headdress, discovered in Rome, either Roman or Hellenistic Egyptian art, Parian marble, 1st century BC, from the Capitoline Museums

==== Medieval and early modern reception ====
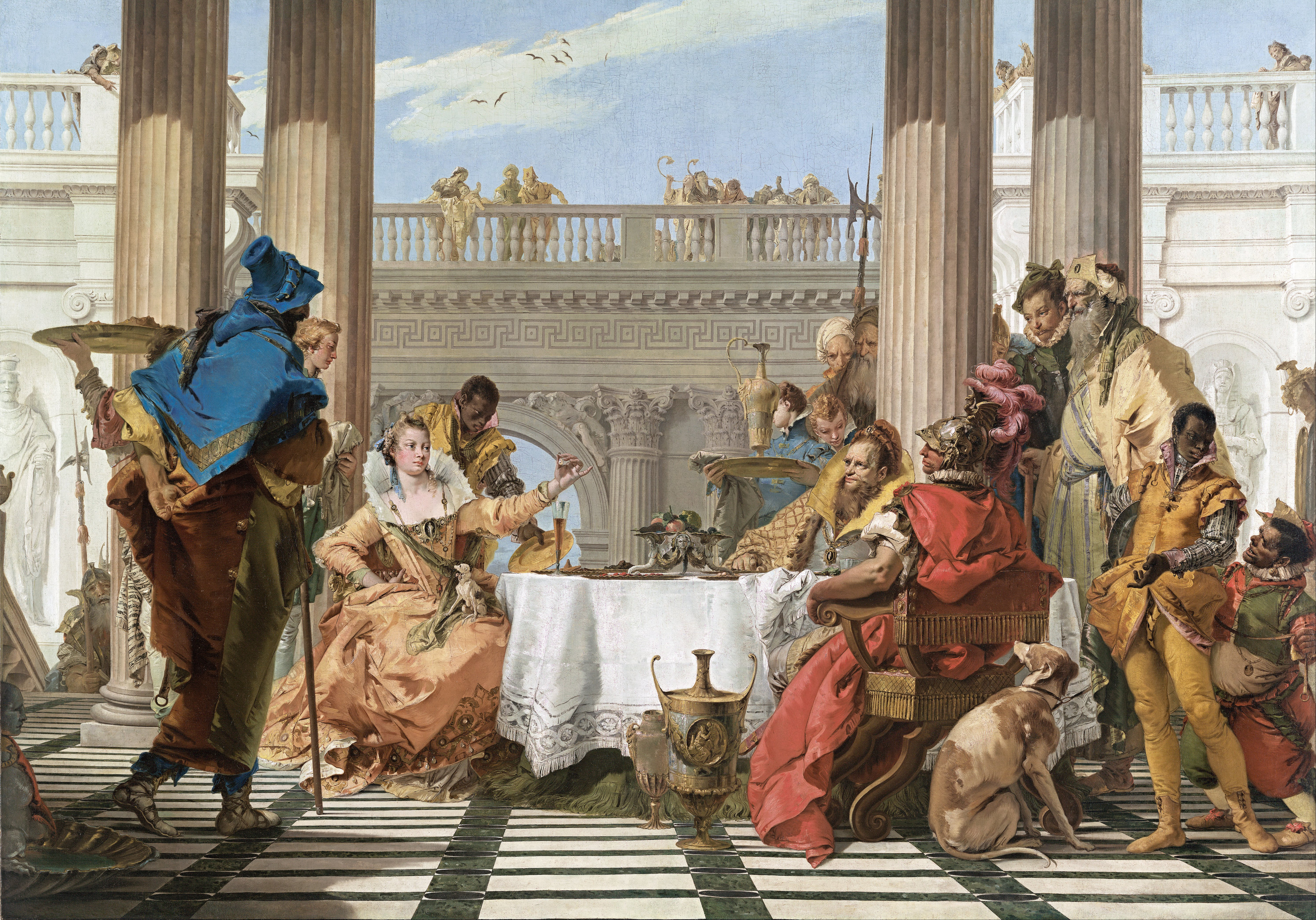
The Banquet of Cleopatra (1744), by Giovanni Battista Tiepolo, now in the National Gallery of Victoria, Melbourne

Cleopatra has become an icon of popular culture, a reputation shaped by theatrical representations dating back to the Renaissance as well as paintings and films. This material largely surpasses classical historiographic writings about her and has more greatly influenced her public view. The 14th-century English poet Geoffrey Chaucer, in The Legend of Good Women, contextualized Cleopatra for the Christian world of the Middle Ages. His depiction of Cleopatra and Antony has been interpreted as being either playful or misogynistic satire.

Chaucer highlighted Cleopatra's relationships with only two men as hardly the life of a seductress and wrote his works partly responding to her negative depiction in the Italian poet Giovanni Boccaccio's Latin works De Mulieribus Claris and De Casibus Virorum Illustrium. The Renaissance humanist Bernardino Cacciante, in his 1504 Libretto apologetico delle donne, was the first Italian to defend Cleopatra's reputation and criticize the perceived moralizing and misogyny in Boccaccio's works. Arabic-language Islamic historiographical works covered Cleopatra's reign, such as the 10th-century Meadows of Gold by Al-Masudi, although his work erroneously claimed that Octavian died soon after Cleopatra's suicide.

Cleopatra appeared in miniatures for illuminated manuscripts, such as the Boucicaut Master's 1409 depiction of her and Antony lying in a Gothic-style tomb. In the visual arts, the sculpted depiction of Cleopatra as a free-standing nude figure committing suicide began with the 16th-century sculptors Bartolommeo Bandinelli and Alessandro Vittoria. Early prints depicting Cleopatra include designs by the Renaissance artists Raphael and Michelangelo, as well as 15th-century woodcuts in illustrated editions of Boccaccio's works.

In the performing arts, the death of Elizabeth I of England in 1603 inspired Samuel Daniel to alter and republish his 1594 play Cleopatra in 1607. William Shakespeare's Antony and Cleopatra, largely based on Plutarch, premiered in 1608 and depicted her somewhat salaciously in stark contrast to England's own Virgin Queen. Cleopatra was also featured in operas, such as George Frideric Handel's 1724 Giulio Cesare in Egitto and Domenico Cimarosa's 1789 Cleopatra.

==== Modern depictions and brand imaging ====
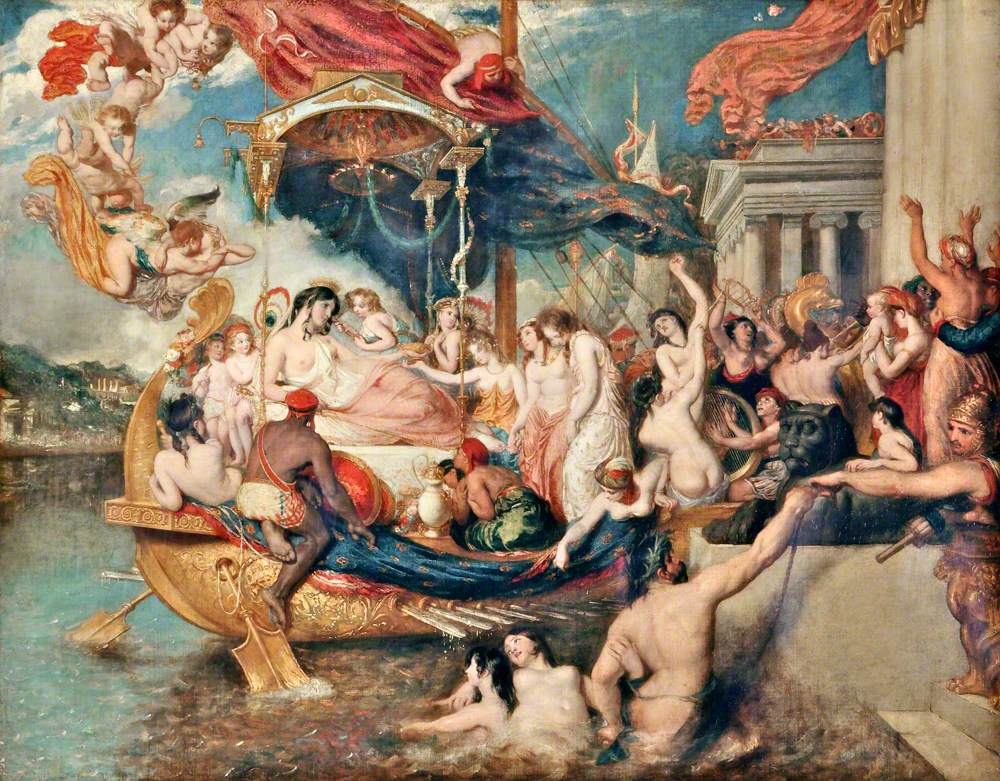
The Triumph of Cleopatra (1821), by William Etty, now in the Lady Lever Art Gallery, Port Sunlight, England

In Victorian Britain, Cleopatra was highly associated with many aspects of ancient Egyptian culture and her image was used to market various household products, including oil lamps, lithographs, postcards and cigarettes. Victorian novels such as H. Rider Haggard's Cleopatra (1889) and Théophile Gautier's One of Cleopatra's Nights (1838) depicted her as a sensual and mystic Easterner. The Egyptologist Georg Ebers's Cleopatra (1894) was more grounded in historical accuracy. The French dramatist Victorien Sardou and Irish playwright George Bernard Shaw produced plays about Cleopatra, while burlesque shows such as F. C. Burnand's Antony and Cleopatra offered satirical depictions connecting Cleopatra and her social environment with the modern age.

Shakespeare's Antony and Cleopatra was considered canonical by the Victorian era. Its popularity led to the perception that the 1885 painting by Lawrence Alma-Tadema depicted the meeting of Antony and Cleopatra on her pleasure barge in Tarsus, although Alma-Tadema revealed in a private letter that it depicts a subsequent meeting of theirs in Alexandria. Samuel Barber's opera Antony and Cleopatra (1966) was based on Shakespeare's play and commissioned for the opening of the Metropolitan Opera House. In his unfinished 1825 short story The Egyptian Nights, Alexander Pushkin popularized the claims of the 4th-century Roman historian Aurelius Victor, previously largely ignored, that Cleopatra had prostituted herself to men who paid for sex with their lives. East Asian audiences also appreciated her; the Qing-dynasty Chinese scholar Yan Fu wrote an extensive biography of her.

Georges Méliès's Robbing Cleopatra's Tomb (French: Cléopâtre), an 1899 French silent horror film, was the first film to depict Cleopatra. Victorian portrayals influenced 20th-century Hollywood films, shaping the character of Cleopatra played by Theda Bara in Cleopatra (1917), Claudette Colbert in Cleopatra (1934), and Elizabeth Taylor in Cleopatra (1963). In addition to her portrayal as a "vampire" queen, Bara's Cleopatra incorporated tropes familiar from 19th-century Orientalist painting, such as despotic behavior, mixed with dangerous and overt female sexuality. Colbert's Cleopatra served as a glamour model for selling Egyptian-themed products in department stores in the 1930s, targeting female moviegoers. As a result the modern myth of Cleopatra bathing in milk resulted from Colbert also having played the Roman empress Poppaea Sabina, who is said to have bathed in milk. In preparation for the film starring Taylor as Cleopatra, women's magazines of the early 1960s advertised how to use makeup, clothes, jewelry, and hairstyles to achieve the "Egyptian" look similar to the queens Cleopatra and Nefertiti. By the end of the century, forty-three films, two hundred plays and novels, forty-five operas, and five ballets were associated with Cleopatra.

=== Written works ===
Whereas myths about Cleopatra persist in popular media, important aspects of her career go largely unnoticed, such as her command of naval forces and administrative acts. Greek medical writings attributed to her were likely written by a later physician of the same name. Ingrid D. Rowland highlights that medieval scholars likely conflated "Berenice called Cleopatra", cited by the 3rd- or 4th-century Roman physician Metrodora, as referring to the pharaoh. Only fragments exist of these medical and cosmetic writings, such as those preserved by Galen, including remedies for hair disease, baldness, and dandruff, along with a list of weights and measures for pharmacological purposes. Aëtius of Amida attributed a recipe for perfumed soap to Cleopatra, while Paul of Aegina preserved alleged instructions of hers for dyeing and curling hair.

== Ancestry ==
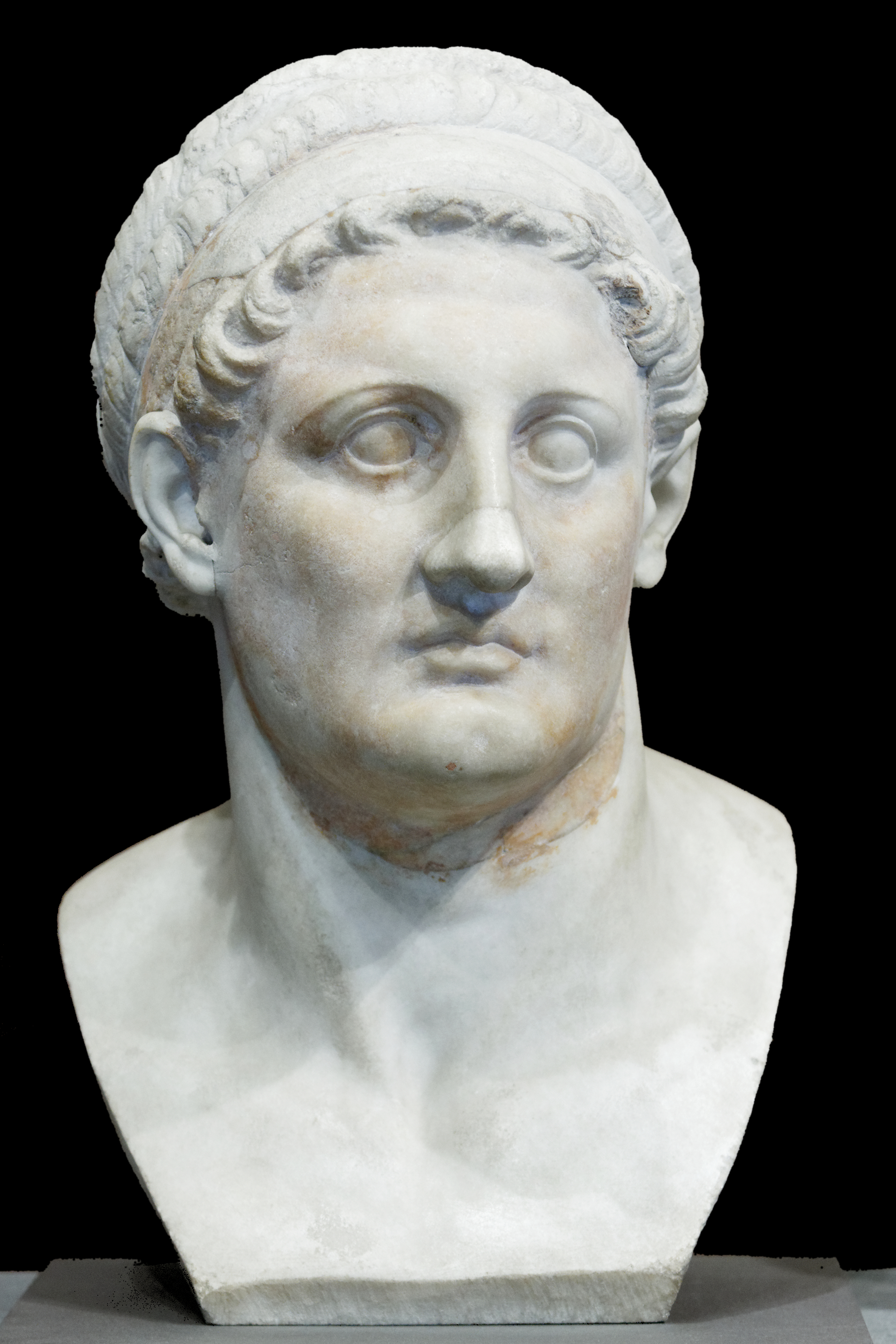
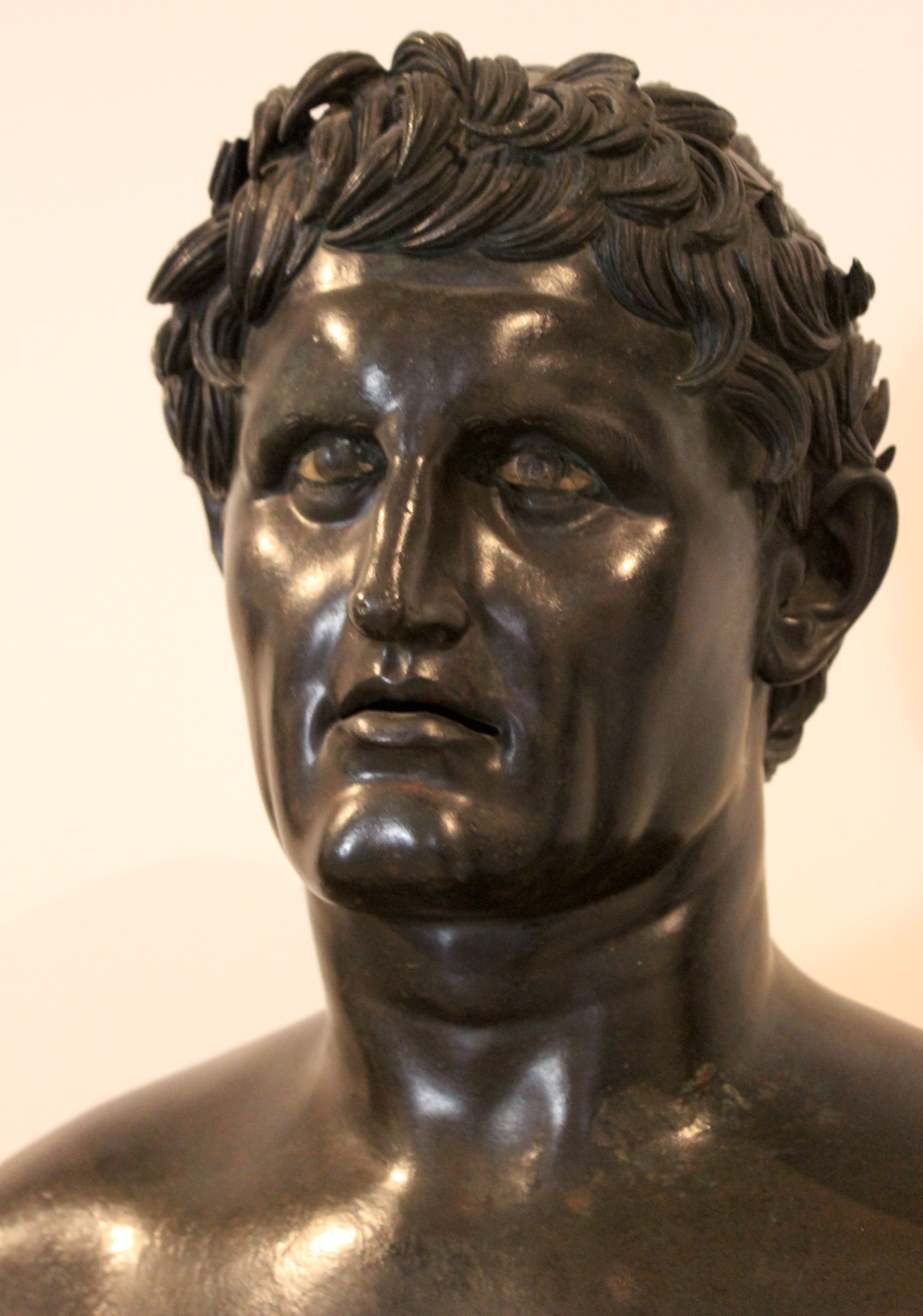
Left: A Hellenistic bust of Ptolemy I Soter, now in the Louvre, Paris
Right: A bust of Seleucus I Nicator, a Roman copy of a Greek original, from the Villa of the Papyri, Herculaneum, and now in the National Archaeological Museum, Naples
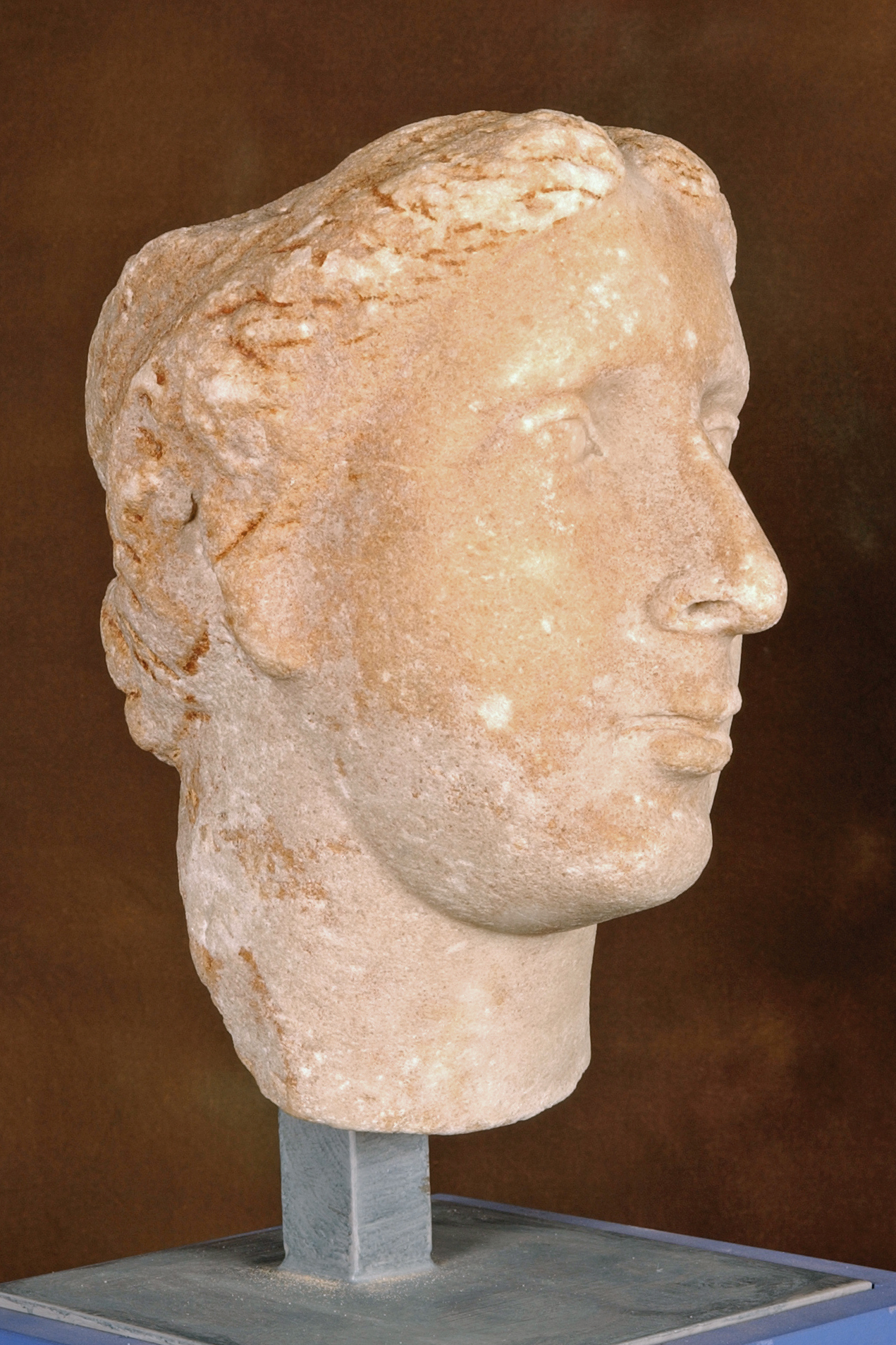
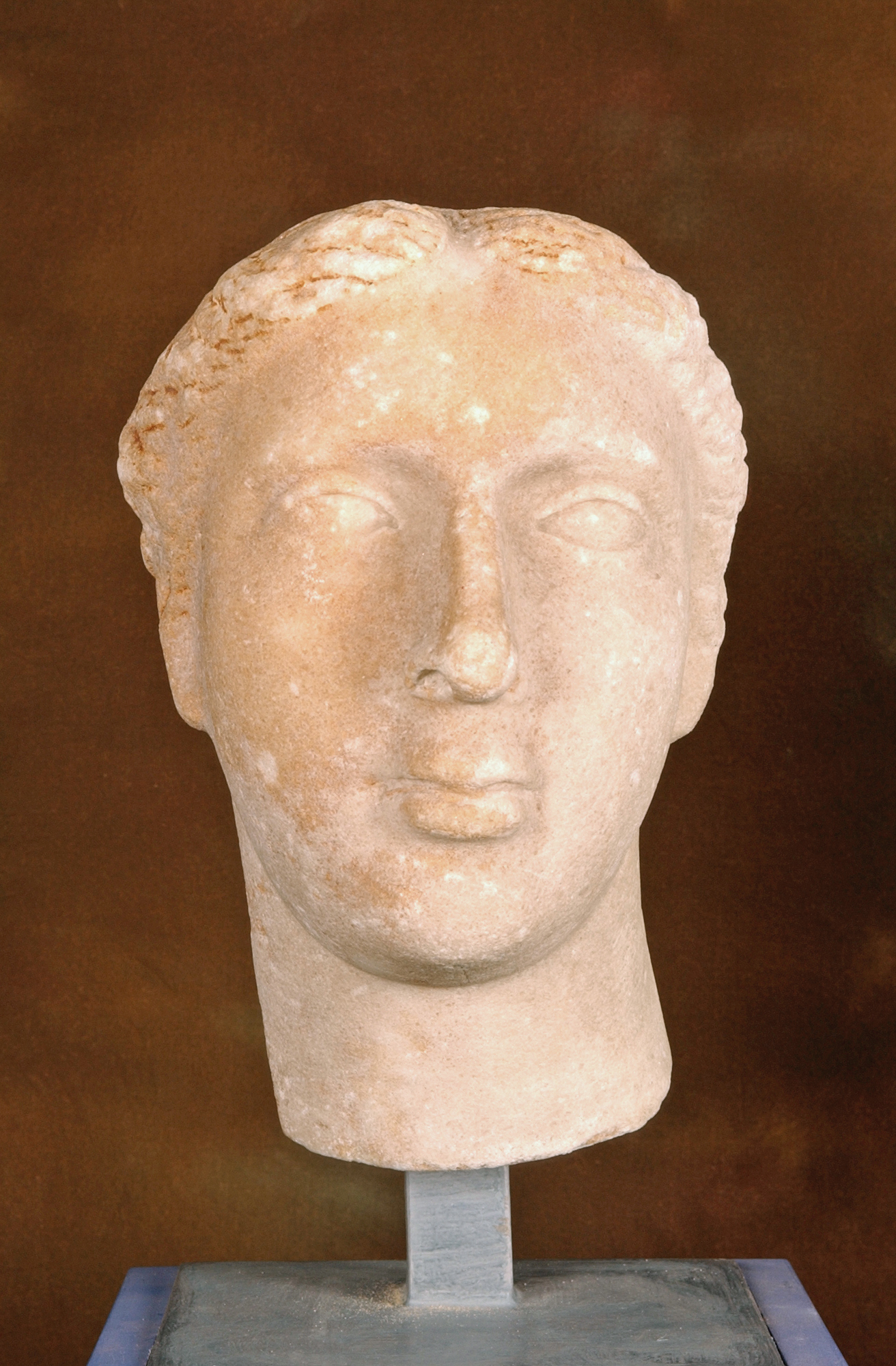
A likely sculpture of Cleopatra V Tryphaena (also known as Cleopatra VI), 1st century BC, from Lower Egypt, now in the Musée Saint-Raymond

Cleopatra belonged to the Macedonian Greek Ptolemaic dynasty, (Note: For further information on Cleopatra's Macedonian Greek lineage, see Pucci (2011, p. 201), Grant (1972, pp. 3–5), Burstein (2004, pp. 3, 34, 36, 43, 63–64) and Royster (2003, pp. 47–49).) whose origins lay in northern Greece. Through her father Ptolemy XII Auletes, she was a descendant of two prominent companions of Alexander the Great of Macedon: the general Ptolemy I Soter, founder of the Ptolemaic Kingdom of Egypt, and Seleucus I Nicator, the Macedonian Greek founder of the Seleucid Empire of West Asia. (Note: For further information and validation of the foundation of Hellenistic Egypt by Alexander the Great and Cleopatra's ancestry stretching back to Ptolemy I Soter, see Grant (1972, pp. 7–8) and Jones (2006, p. 3).) The identity of her mother is uncertain, (Note: For further information, see Grant (1972, pp. 3–4) and Burstein (2004, p. 11).) but she was presumably Cleopatra V Tryphaena, Ptolemy XII's sister-wife and the mother of his eldest daughter, Berenice IV. (Note: For further information, see Fletcher (2008, pp. 69, 74, 76). Contrary to other sources cited here, Dodson & Hilton (2004, pp. 268–269, 273) refer to Cleopatra V Tryphaena as a possible cousin or sister of Ptolemy XII Auletes.)

Cleopatra I Syra was the only member of the Ptolemaic dynasty known for certain to have introduced some non-Greek ancestry. Her mother Laodice III was a daughter of the Persian King Mithridates II of Pontus and his wife Laodice of mixed Greek-Persian heritage. Cleopatra I's father, Antiochus III the Great, was a descendant of Queen Apama, the Sogdian Iranian wife of Seleucus I Nicator. (Note: For the Sogdian ancestry of Apama, wife of Seleucus I Nicator, see Holt (1989, pp. 64–65, footnote 63).) It is generally believed that the Ptolemies did not intermarry with native Egyptians. (Note: As explained by Burstein (2004, pp. 47–50), the main ethnic groups of Ptolemaic Egypt were Egyptians, Greeks, and Jews, each of whom were legally segregated, living in different residential quarters and forbidden to intermarry with one another in the multicultural cities of Alexandria, Naucratis, and Ptolemais Hermiou. It had been speculated in some circles that Pasherienptah III, the High Priest of Ptah at Memphis, Egypt, was Cleopatra's half-cousin, speculation which has been recently refuted by Cheshire (2011, pp. 20–30).) Michael Grant asserts that among the Ptolemaic kings, there is only one known Egyptian mistress and no known Egyptian wife, further arguing that Cleopatra probably did not have any Egyptian ancestry and "would have described herself as Greek". (Note: Grant (1972, p. 5) argues that Cleopatra's grandmother, i.e. the mother of Ptolemy XII, might have been a Syrian (though conceding that "it is possible she was also partly Greek"), but almost certainly not an Egyptian because there is only one known Egyptian mistress of a Ptolemaic ruler throughout their entire dynasty.)

Stacy Schiff argues that it was rare for the Ptolemies to have an Egyptian mistress. (Note: Schiff (2011, p. 42) states that Cleopatra, as a Macedonian Greek with some Persian ancestry, was not dark-skinned, though notes Cleopatra was likely not among the Ptolemies with fair features, and instead would have been honey-skinned, citing as evidence that her relatives were described as such and it "would have presumably applied to her as well." Goldsworthy (2010, pp. 127, 128) agrees to this, contending that Cleopatra, having Macedonian blood with a little Syrian, was probably not dark-skinned (as Roman propaganda never mentions it), writing "fairer skin is marginally more likely considering her ancestry," though also notes she could have had a "darker more Mediterranean complexion" because of her mixed ancestry. Grant (1972, p. 5) agrees with Goldsworthy's latter speculation of her skin color, that though almost certainly not Egyptian, Cleopatra had a darker complexion due to being Greek mixed with Persian and possibly Syrian ancestry. Preston (2009, p. 77) agrees with Grant that, considering this ancestry, Cleopatra was "almost certainly dark-haired and olive-skinned." Bradford (2000, p. 14) contends that it is "reasonable to infer" Cleopatra had dark hair and "pale olive skin.") Duane W. Roller speculates that Cleopatra's mother could have been a half-Macedonian-Greek, half-Egyptian woman from Memphis in northern Egypt belonging to a family of priests dedicated to Ptah, (Note: For further information on the identity of Cleopatra's mother, see Burstein (2004, p. 11), Fletcher (2008, p. 73), Goldsworthy (2010, pp. 127, 128), Grant (1972, p. 4), Roller (2010, pp. 165–166) and Bennett (1997, pp. 39–66). Joann Fletcher finds this hypothesis to be dubious and lacking evidence. Stanley M. Burstein claims that strong circumstantial evidence suggests Cleopatra's mother could have been a member of the priestly family of Ptah, but that historians generally assume her mother was Cleopatra V Tryphaena, wife of Ptolemy XII. Adrian Goldsworthy dismisses the idea of Cleopatra's mother being a member of an Egyptian priestly family as "pure conjecture," adding that either Cleopatra V or a concubine "probably of Greek origin" would be Cleopatra VII's mother. Michael Grant contends that Cleopatra V was most likely Cleopatra VII's mother. Duane W. Roller notes that while Cleopatra could have been the daughter of the priestly family of Ptah, the other main candidate would be Cleopatra VI, maintaining the uncertainty stems from Cleopatra V/VI's "loss of favor" that "obscured the issue." He also posits that Cleopatra being the only known ruler of the Ptolemaic Dynasty to speak Egyptian, along with her daughter Cleopatra Selene II as Queen of Mauretania publicly honoring the native Egyptian elite, both lend credence to the priestly class mistress hypothesis for maternity. Christopher Bennett points out that with Cleopatra VII having a birthdate of 69 BC, she was "certainly conceived before Cleopatra V disappears from the record" and thus it follows that Cleopatra V had to be the mother of Cleopatra VII. He further argues that this fact alone, among others he discusses, is "sufficient to dispose" of the argument of a hypothetical Egyptian Memphite aristocrat as the mother of Cleopatra VII. Part of Burstein's and Roller's argument rests on a speculated earlier marriage between Psenptais II and a certain "Berenice", once argued to possibly be a daughter of Ptolemy VIII. However, this speculation was refuted by Egyptologist Wendy Cheshire, who was later validated by papyrologist Sandra Lippert. See Cheshire (2011, pp. 20–30) and Lippert (2013, pp. 33–48).) but contends that she most valued her Greek Ptolemaic heritage. (Note: Schiff (2011, pp. 2) concurs with this, concluding that Cleopatra "upheld the family tradition." As noted by Dudley (1960, pp. 57), Cleopatra and her family were "the successor[s] to the native Pharaohs, exploiting through a highly organized bureaucracy the great natural resources of the Nile Valley.") Ernle Bradford writes that Cleopatra challenged Rome not as an Egyptian woman "but as a civilized Greek". Claims that Cleopatra was an illegitimate child never appeared in Roman propaganda against her; (Note: Grant (1972, p. 4) argues that if Cleopatra had been illegitimate, her "numerous Roman enemies would have revealed this to the world.") Strabo was the only ancient historian who claimed that she and her younger siblings were illegitimate.

=== Incestuousness ===
The high degree of inbreeding among the Ptolemies is also illustrated by Cleopatra's immediate ancestry, of which a reconstruction is shown below. (Note: The family tree and short discussions of the individuals can be found in Dodson & Hilton (2004, pp. 268–281). Aidan Dodson and Dyan Hilton refer to Cleopatra V as Cleopatra VI and Cleopatra Selene of Syria is called Cleopatra V Selene. Dotted lines in the chart below indicate possible but disputed parentage.) The family tree given below also lists Cleopatra V as a daughter of Ptolemy X Alexander I and Berenice III. This would make her a cousin of her husband, Ptolemy XII, but she could have been a daughter of Ptolemy IX Lathyros, which would have made her her husband's sister instead. The sometimes conflated Cleopatra VI may have actually been Ptolemy XII's daughter. Fletcher and John Whitehorne assert that this is a possible indication Cleopatra V had died in 69 BC rather than reappearing as a co-ruler with Berenice IV in 58 BC (during Ptolemy XII's exile in Rome).

Ptolemy V Epiphanes	Cleopatra I Syra
Ptolemy VI Philometor	Cleopatra II
Ptolemy VIII Physcon	Cleopatra III
Cleopatra Selene of Syria	Ptolemy IX Lathyros	Cleopatra IV
Ptolemy X Alexander I	Berenice III
Cleopatra V Tryphaena	Ptolemy XII Auletes
Cleopatra VII

== See also ==
- List of female hereditary monarchs

== Notes ==
Cleopatra Ptolemaic dynasty Born: 69 BC Died: 30 BC
Regnal titles
Preceded by Ptolemy XII	Pharaoh of Egypt; 51–30 BC with Ptolemy XIII, Ptolemy XIV and Ptolemy XV	Office abolished Egypt annexed by Roman Republic
