= Military campaigns of Julius Caesar =

Caesar's military campaigns of 58–50 and 49–45 BC

Gaius Julius Caesar
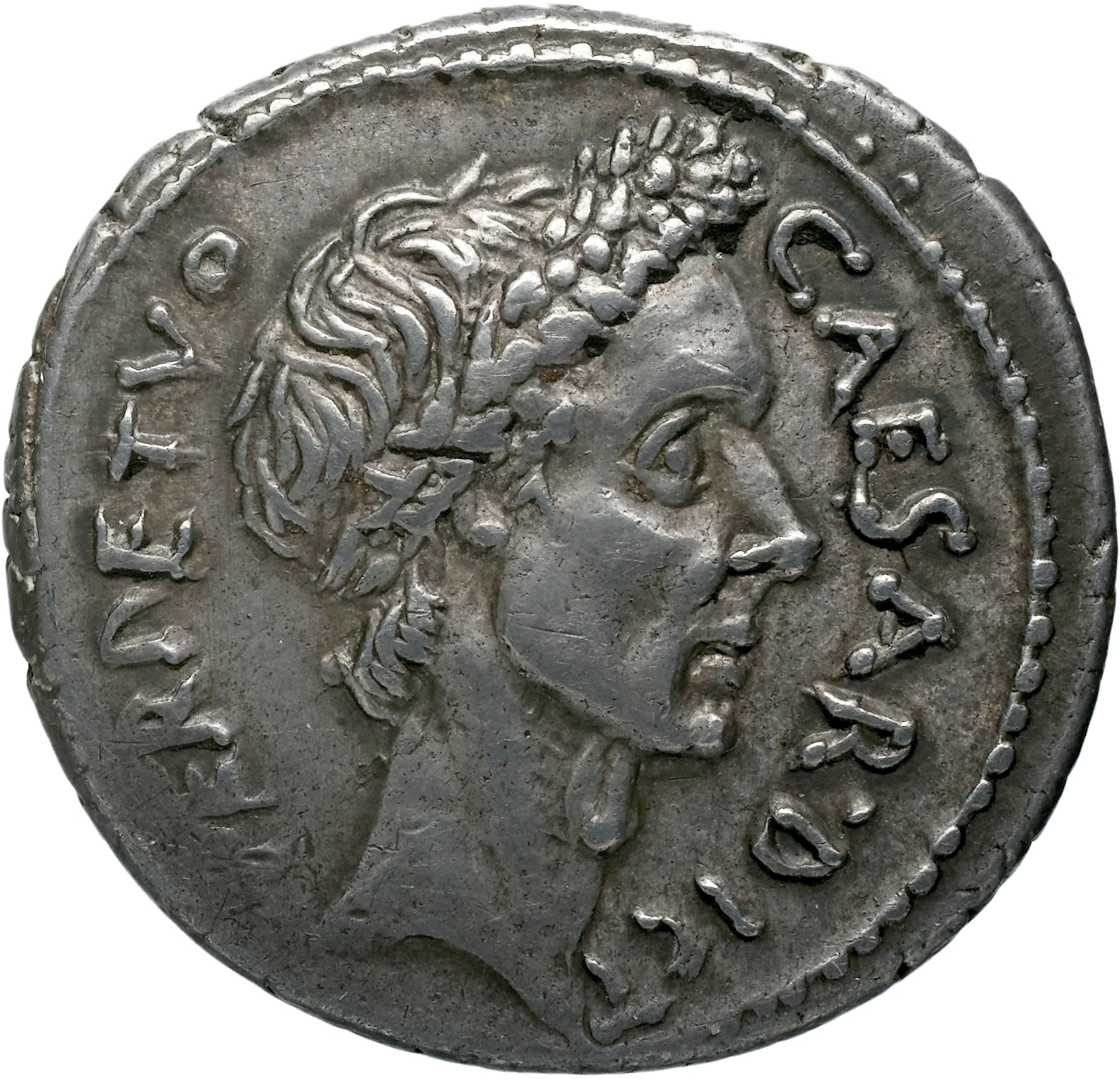
- Denarius depicting the laureate effigy of Julius Caesar, 43 BC
- Born: 12 July 100 BC; Rome, Italia
- Died: 15 March 44 BC (aged 55) Rome, Italia
- Allegiance: Rome; Caesarians
- Branch: Roman army
- Service years: 81-47 BC
- Conflicts: Siege of Mytilene; Callaeci Campaign; Gallic Wars; Battle of the Arar; Battle of Bibracte; Battle of Vosges; Battle of the Sabis; Battle of the Axona; Invasions of Britain; Battle of Gergovia; Battle of Alesia; Siege of Uxellodunum; Caesar's civil war; Siege of Corfinium; Siege of Brundisium; Battle of Ilerda; Battle of Dyrrhachium; Battle of Pharsalus; Alexandrian war; Siege of Alexandria; Battle of the Nile; Battle of Zela; Battle of Ruspina; Battle of Thapsus; Battle of Munda; Siege of Corduba
- Awards: Civic Crown; Triumph

The military campaigns of Julius Caesar were a series of wars that reshaped the political landscape of the Roman Republic, expanded its territories, and ultimately paved the way for the transition from republic to empire. The wars constituted both the Gallic Wars (58 BC–51 BC) and Caesar's civil war (49 BC–45 BC).

The Gallic Wars principally took place in the region of Gaul, or what is now modern-day France. These campaigns, starting with the Battle of the Arar (Saône) River, were conducted between 58 and 50 BC. Caesar faced formidable resistance from Gallic chieftains such as Vercingetorix and Dumnorix. Despite numerous challenges, Caesar and his legions managed to conquer the territories and incorporate them into the Roman Republic. During the campaigns in 55 and 54 BC, Caesar invaded Britain, marking the first Roman expeditions to the island. These campaigns were characterized by fierce battles against various Celtic tribes. The Gallic War ended with Roman victory at the Battle of Alesia.

During the Civil War, Caesar pursued his rivals to Greece, where he engaged in a series of decisive confrontations, and solidified Roman control over the Eastern Mediterranean. These battles, notably the Battle of Pharsalus in 48 BC, marked significant turning points in the conflict, ultimately leading to Caesar's triumph over the forces of Pompey the Great.

He proceeded to Egypt, where he emerged victorious against the Egyptian pharaoh, facilitating the ascension of Cleopatra to the throne. He then went on to subdue his Roman opponents in Africa and Hispania. Once his campaigns were concluded, he served as Roman dictator until his assassination on 15 March 44 BC.

These wars were critically important in the transition of the Roman Republic into the Roman Empire.

== Early military career ==
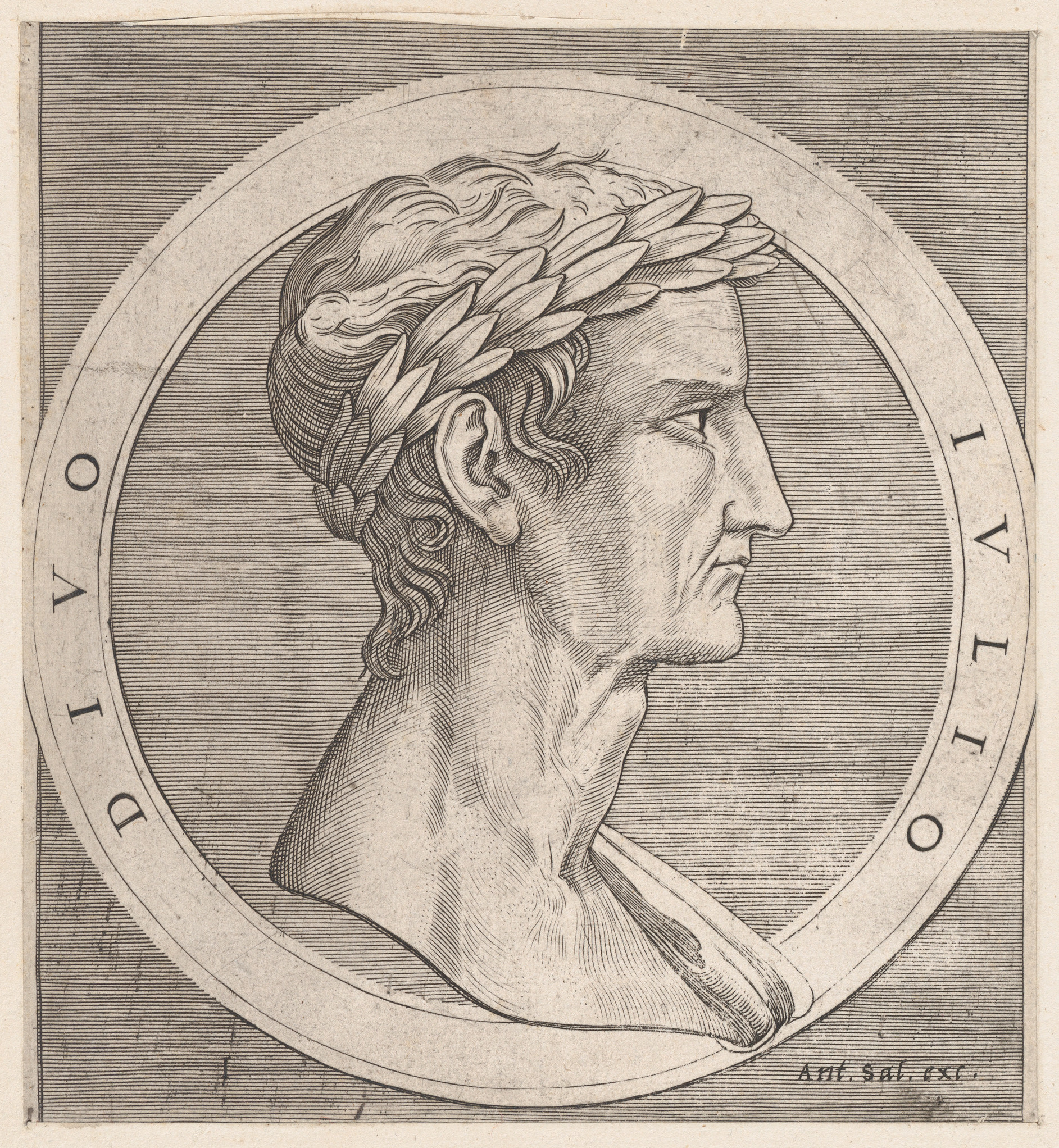
Julius Caesar was awarded the Civic Crown for his service in Siege of Mytilene

Gaius Julius Caesar was born into an influential patrician family, the gens Julia. His father, Gaius Julius Caesar, was the governor of the province of Asia, and his mother, Aurelia, came from an influential family who were supporters of Sulla. In 85 BC, at the age of 16, Caesar became the head of his family after his father’s death, which coincided with the civil war between Sulla and supporters of Caesar's uncle Gaius Marius. When Marius and his ally Lucius Cornelius Cinna were in control of Rome, Caesar was nominated as the new flamen Dialis (high priest of Jupiter), and he was married to Cinna's daughter Cornelia. After Sulla's ultimate victory, he enacted a brutal purge of the supporters of Marius, including Caesar. He was stripped of his inheritance, his position of high priest and was forced to go into hiding after refusing to divorce Cornelia. Sulla eventually ended his persecution of Caesar after his mothers family intervened on his behalf. Soon after this, Caesar entered into service in the army in 81 BC in an attempt to leave Rome should Sulla change his mind.

He first served under the command of Marcus Minucius Thermus in Asia and Servilius Isauricus in Cilicia. He won early distinction by earning the Civic Crown for his actions at the Siege of Mytilene and later secured the assistance of King Nicomedes's fleet during a diplomatic mission to Bithynia.

After Sulla's death in 78 BC, Caesar returned to Rome where he was elected military tribune. This served as his entry into politics and in 69 BC, he was elected as quaestor in the province of Hispania. He was also elected to Pontifex maximus and was eventually made governor of Hispania Ulterior. While in Hispania, Caesar held the title of Imperator and lead military campaigns against local tribes.

Three candidates stood for the consulship in 59 BC: Caesar, Marcus Calpurnius Bibulus who had been aedile with Caesar several years earlier, and Lucius Lucceius. The election was dirty. Caesar canvassed Cicero for support, and made an alliance with the wealthy Lucceius, but the establishment threw its financial weight behind the conservative Bibulus, and even Cato, with his reputation for incorruptibility, is said to have resorted to bribery in his favor. Caesar and Bibulus were elected as consuls.

Caesar was already in Crassus' political debt, but he also made overtures to Pompey, who was unsuccessfully fighting the Senate for ratification of his eastern settlements and farmland for his veterans. Pompey and Crassus had been at odds since they were consuls together in 70 BC, and Caesar knew if he allied himself with one he would lose the support of the other, so he endeavored to reconcile them. Between the three of them, they had enough money and political influence to control public business. This informal alliance, known as the First Triumvirate (rule of three men), was cemented by the marriage of Pompey to Caesar's daughter Julia. Caesar also married again, this time Calpurnia, daughter of Lucius Calpurnius Piso Caesoninus, who was elected to the consulship for the following year.

Caesar proposed a law for the redistribution of public lands to the poor, a proposal supported by Pompey, by force of arms if need be, and by Crassus, making the triumvirate public. Pompey filled the city with soldiers, and the triumvirate's opponents were intimidated. Bibulus attempted to declare the omens unfavorable and thus void the new law, but was driven from the forum by Caesar's armed supporters. His lictors had their fasces broken, two tribunes accompanying him were wounded, and Bibulus himself had a bucket of excrement thrown over him. In fear of his life, he retired to his house for the rest of the year, issuing occasional proclamations of bad omens. These attempts to obstruct Caesar's legislation proved ineffective. Roman satirists ever after referred to the year as "the consulship of Julius and Caesar".

This also gave rise to this lampoon:

The event occurred, as I recall, when Caesar governed Rome-

Caesar, not Bibulus, who kept his seat at home.

When Caesar and Bibulus were first elected, the aristocracy tried to limit Caesar's future power by allotting the woods and pastures of Italy, rather than governorship of a province, as their proconsular duties after their year of office was over. With the help of Piso and Pompey, Caesar later had this overturned, and was instead appointed to govern Cisalpine Gaul (northern Italy) and Illyricum (the western Balkans), with Transalpine Gaul (southern France) later added, giving him command of four legions. The term of his pro-consulship, and thus his immunity from prosecution, was set at five years, rather than the usual one. When his consulship ended, Caesar narrowly avoided prosecution for the irregularities of his year in office, and quickly left for his province.

== Conquest of Gaul ==
Map of Caesar’s campaigns in Gaul.

Caesar was still deeply in debt, and there was money to be made as a provincial governor, whether by extortion or by military adventurism. Caesar had four legions under his command, two of his provinces, Illyricum and Gallia Narbonensis, bordered on unconquered territory, and independent Gaul was known to be unstable. Rome's allies the Aedui had been defeated by their Gallic rivals, with the help of a contingent of Germanic Suebi under Ariovistus, who had settled in conquered Aeduan land, and the Helvetii were mobilizing for a mass migration, which the Romans feared had warlike intent. Caesar raised two new legions and defeated first the Helvetii, then Ariovistus, and left his army in winter quarters in the territory of the Sequani, signaling that his interest in the lands outside Gallia Narbonensis would not be temporary.

Caesar began his second year with double the military strength of the previous year, having raised another two legions in Cisalpine Gaul during the winter. The legality of this was dubious, as the Cisalpine Gauls were not Roman citizens. In response to his activities the previous year, the Belgic tribes of north-eastern Gaul had begun to arm themselves. Caesar treated this as an aggressive move and, after an inconclusive engagement against a united Belgic army, conquered the tribes piecemeal. Meanwhile, one legion, commanded by Crassus' son Publius, began the conquest of the tribes of the Armorican peninsula.

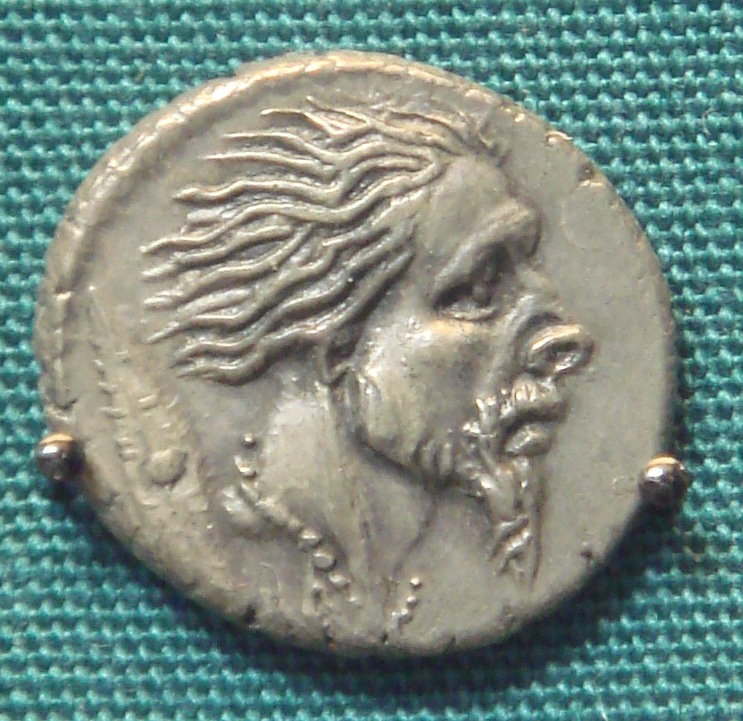
Roman silver denarius with the head of captive Gaul 48 BC, following the campaigns of Caesar

During the spring of 56 BC a conference was held at Luca (modern Lucca) in Cisalpine Gaul. Rome was in turmoil, and Clodius' populist campaigns had been undermining relations between Crassus and Pompey. The meeting renewed the Triumvirate and extended Caesar's proconsulship for another five years. Crassus and Pompey would be consuls again, with similarly long-term proconsulships to follow: Syria for Crassus, the Hispanian provinces for Pompey. The conquest of Armorica was completed when Caesar defeated the Veneti in a naval battle, while young Crassus conquered the Aquitani of the south-west. By the end of campaigning in 56 BC only the Morini and Menapii of the coastal Low Countries still held out.

In 55 BC, Caesar repelled an incursion into Gaul by the Germanic Usipetes and Tencteri, and followed it up by building a bridge across the Rhine and making a show of force in Germanic territory, before returning and dismantling the bridge. Late that summer, having subdued the Morini and Menapii, he crossed to Britain, claiming that the Britons had aided the Veneti against him the previous year. His intelligence was poor, and although he gained a beachhead on the Kent coast he was unable to advance further, and returned to Gaul for the winter. He returned the following year, better prepared and with a larger force, and achieved more. He advanced inland, establishing Mandubracius of the Trinovantes as a friendly king and bringing his rival, Cassivellaunus, to terms. But poor harvests led to widespread revolt in Gaul, led by Ambiorix of the Eburones, forcing Caesar to campaign through the winter and into the following year. With the defeat of Ambiorix, Caesar believed Gaul was now pacified.

While Caesar was in Britain his daughter Julia, Pompey's wife, had died in childbirth. Caesar tried to regain Pompey's support by offering him his great-niece Octavia in marriage, alienating Octavia's husband Claudius Marcellus, but Pompey declined. In 53 BC, Crassus was killed leading a failed invasion of Parthia. Rome was on the edge of violence. Pompey was appointed sole consul as an emergency measure, and married Cornelia, daughter of Caesar's political opponent Quintus Metellus Scipio, whom he invited to become his consular colleague once order was restored. The Triumvirate was dead.

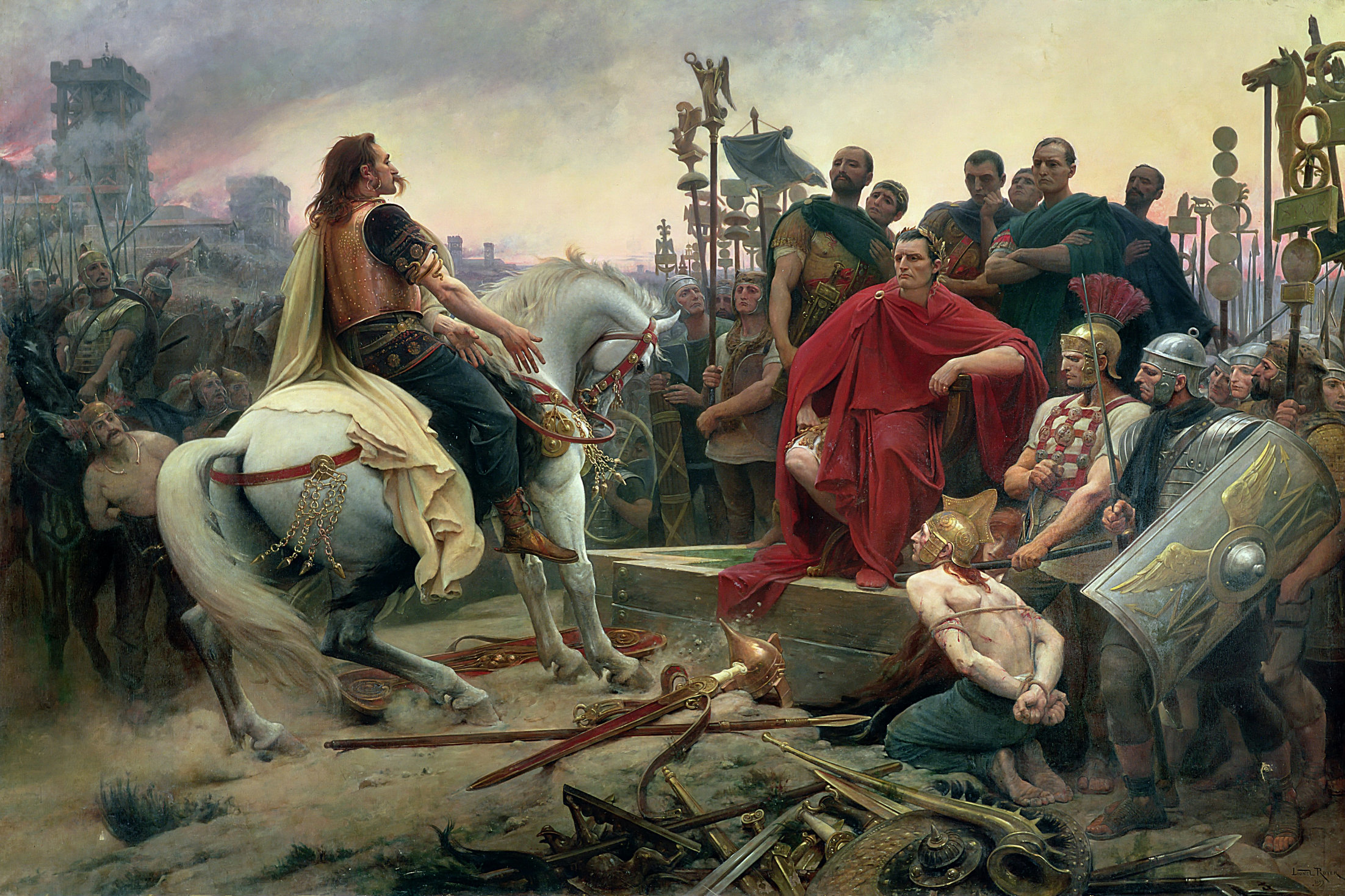
Vercingetorix Surrenders to Caesar, by Lionel Royer

In 52 BC another, larger revolt erupted in Gaul, led by Vercingetorix of the Arverni. Vercingetorix managed to unite the Gallic tribes and proved an astute commander, defeating Caesar in several engagements including the Battle of Gergovia, but Caesar's elaborate siege-works at the Battle of Alesia finally forced his surrender. Despite scattered outbreaks of warfare the following year, Gaul was effectively conquered.

Titus Labienus was Caesar's most senior legate during his Gallic campaigns, having the status of propraetor. Other prominent men who served under him included his relative Lucius Julius Caesar, Crassus' sons Publius and Marcus, Cicero's brother Quintus, Decimus Brutus, and Mark Antony.

Plutarch claimed that the army had fought against three million men in the course of the Gallic Wars, of whom one million died, and another million were enslaved. Three hundred tribes were subjugated and eight hundred cities were destroyed. Almost the entire population of the city of Avaricum (Bourges) (40,000 in all) was slaughtered. Julius Caesar reports that 368,000 of the Helvetii left home, of whom 92,000 could bear arms, and only 110,000 returned after the campaign. However, in view of the difficulty of finding accurate counts in the first place, Caesar's propagandistic purposes, and the common gross exaggeration of numbers in ancient texts, the totals of enemy combatants in particular are likely to be far too high. Furger-Gunti considers an army of more than 60,000 fighting Helvetii extremely unlikely in the view of the tactics described, and assumes the actual numbers to have been around 40,000 warriors out of a total of 160,000 emigrants. Delbrück suggests an even lower number of 100,000 people, out of which only 16,000 were fighters, which would make the Celtic force about half the size of the Roman body of ca. 30,000 men.

== Civil war ==
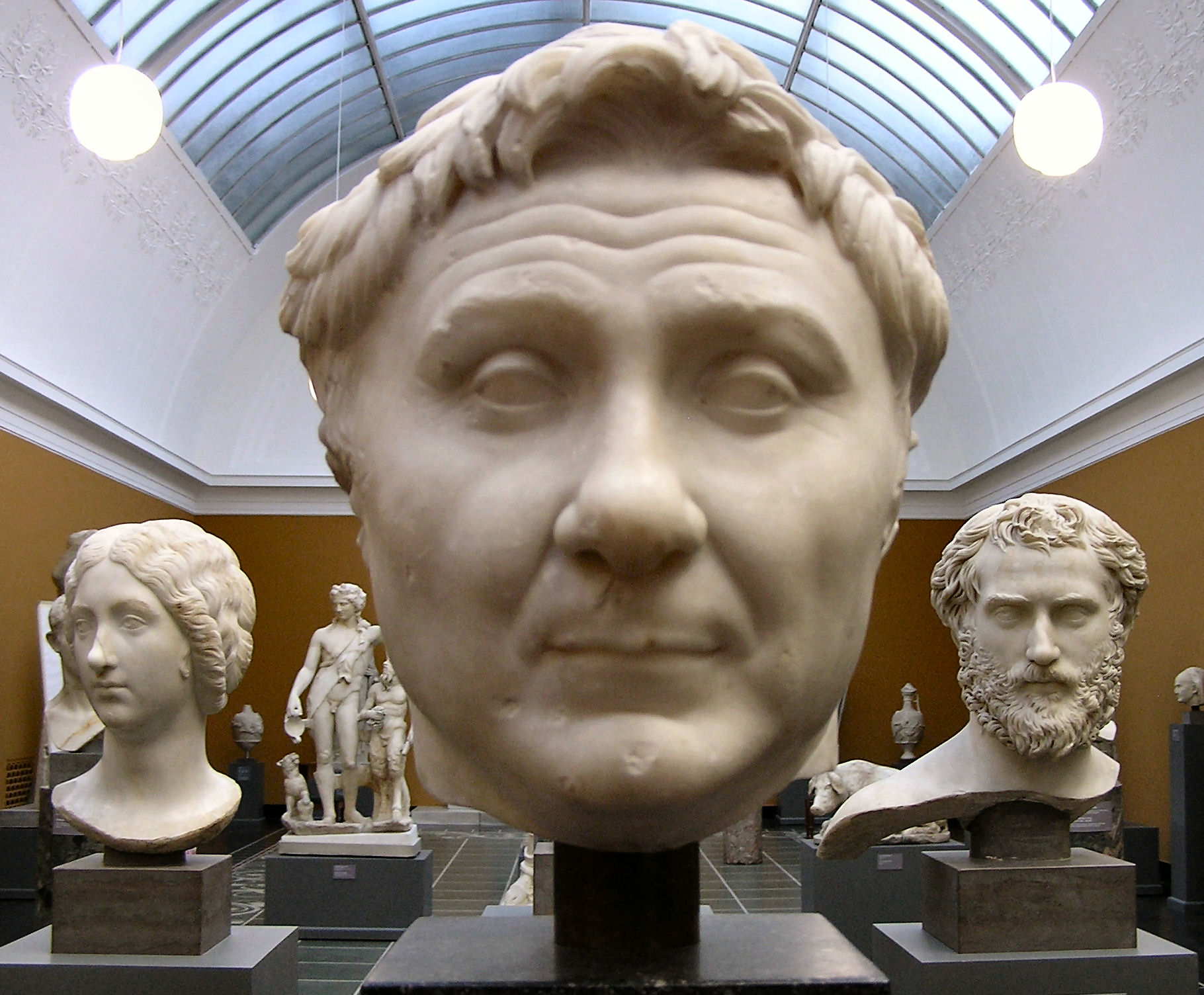
Bust of Pompey the Great in the Ny Carlsberg Glyptotek, Copenhagen

In 50 BC, the Senate, led by Pompey, ordered Caesar to disband his army and return to Rome because his term as Proconsul had finished. Moreover, the Senate forbade Caesar to stand for a second consulship in absentia. Caesar thought he would be prosecuted and politically marginalized if he entered Rome without the immunity enjoyed by a Consul or without the power of his army. Pompey accused Caesar of insubordination and treason. On 10 January 49 BC Caesar crossed the Rubicon river (the frontier boundary of Italy) with only one legion and ignited civil war. Upon crossing the Rubicon, Plutarch reports that Caesar quoted the Athenian playwright Menander in Greek, saying anerrhiphthō kubos (ἀνερρίφθω κύβος; let the dice be tossed). Suetonius gives the Latin approximation alea iacta est (the die has been tossed).

The optimates, including Metellus Scipio and Cato the Younger, fled to the south, having little confidence in the newly raised troops especially since so many cities in northern Italy had voluntarily surrendered. An attempted stand by a consulate legion in Samarium resulted in the consul being handed over by the defenders and the legion surrendering without significant fighting. Despite greatly outnumbering Caesar, who only had his Thirteenth Legion with him, Pompey had no intention of fighting. Caesar pursued Pompey to Brindisium, hoping to capture him before the trapped Senate and their legions could escape. Pompey managed to elude him, sailing out of the harbor before Caesar could break the barricades.

Having near no naval force since Pompey had already scoured the coasts of all ships for evacuation of his forces, Caesar decided to head for Hispania saying "I set forth to fight an army without a leader, so as later to fight a leader without an army." Leaving Marcus Aemilius Lepidus as prefect of Rome, and the rest of Italy under Mark Antony as tribune, Caesar made an astonishing 27-day route-march to Hispania, rejoining two of his Gallic legions, where he defeated Pompey's lieutenants. He then returned east, to challenge Pompey in Greece where on 10 July 48 BC at Dyrrhachium Caesar barely avoided a catastrophic defeat when the line of fortification was broken. He decisively defeated Pompey, despite Pompey's numerical advantage (nearly twice the number of infantry and considerably more cavalry), at Pharsalus in an exceedingly short engagement in 48 BC.

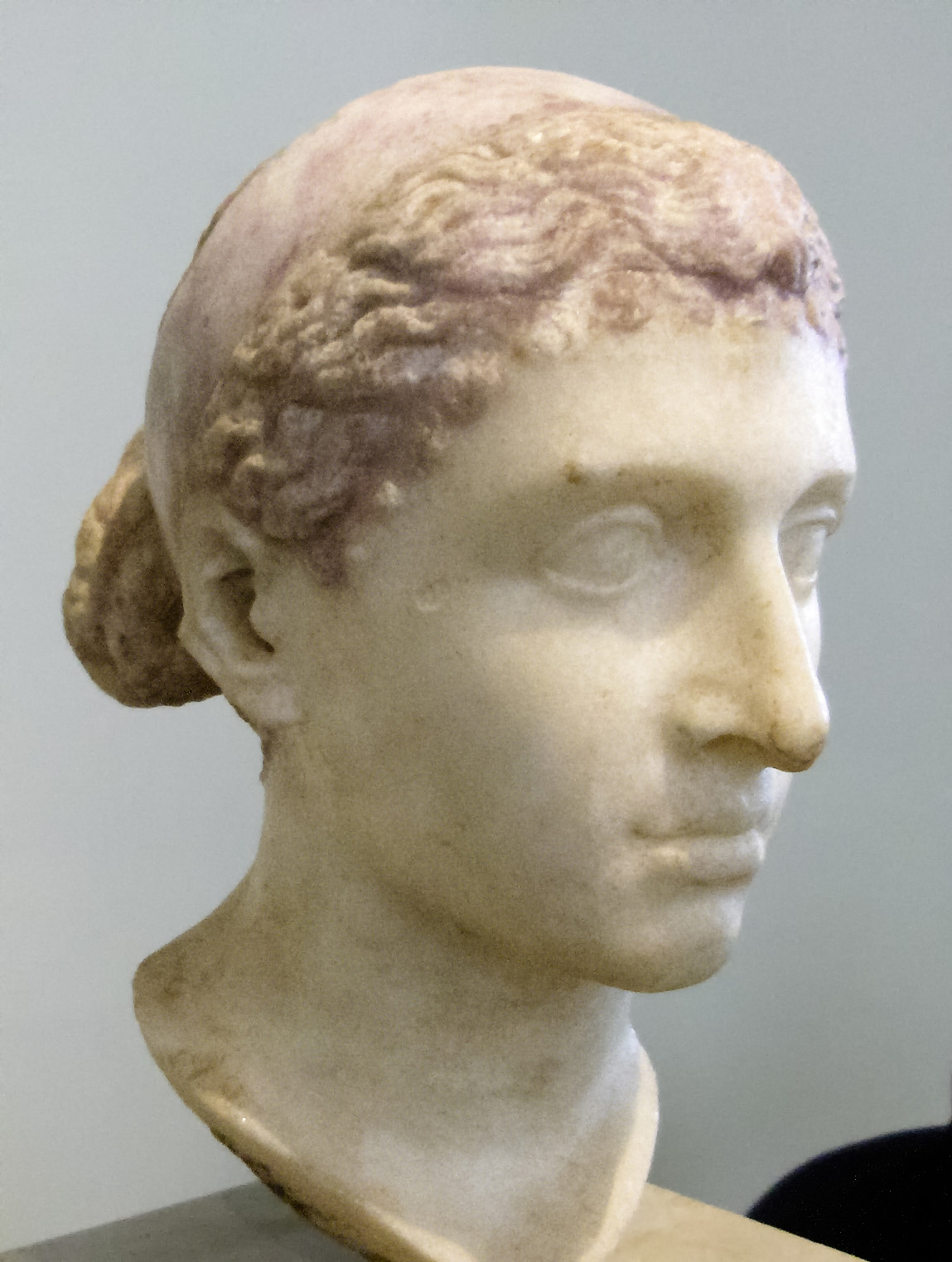
Bust of Cleopatra VII, Altes Museum, Berlin

In Rome, Caesar was appointed dictator, with Mark Antony as his Master of the Horse; Caesar presided over his own election to a second consulate (with Publius Servilius Vatia as his colleague) and then, after eleven days, resigned this dictatorate.

He pursued Pompey to Alexandria, where Pompey was murdered by a former Roman officer serving in the court of King Ptolemy XIII. Caesar then became involved with the Alexandrine civil war between Ptolemy and his sister, wife, and co-regent queen, the Pharaoh Cleopatra VII. Perhaps as a result of Ptolemy's role in Pompey's murder, Caesar sided with Cleopatra; he is reported to have wept at the sight of Pompey's head, which was offered to him by Ptolemy's chamberlain Pothinus as a gift. In any event, Caesar withstood the Siege of Alexandria and latter he defeated the Ptolemaic forces in 47 BC in the Battle of the Nile and installed Cleopatra as ruler. Caesar and Cleopatra celebrated their victory of the Alexandrine civil war with a triumphant procession on the Nile in the spring of 47 BC. The royal barge was accompanied by 400 additional ships, introducing Caesar to the luxurious lifestyle of the Egyptian pharaohs.

Caesar and Cleopatra never married, as Roman Law only recognized marriages between two Roman citizens. Caesar continued his relationship with Cleopatra throughout his last marriage, which lasted 14 years – in Roman eyes, this did not constitute adultery – and may have fathered a son called Caesarion. Cleopatra visited Rome on more than one occasion, residing in Caesar's villa just outside Rome across the Tiber.

Late in 48 BC, Caesar was again appointed Dictator, with a term of one year. After spending the first months of 47 BC in Egypt, Caesar went to the Middle East, where he annihilated King Pharnaces II of Pontus in the Battle of Zela; his victory was so swift and complete that he mocked Pompey's previous victories over such poor enemies. Thence, he proceeded to Africa to deal with the remnants of Pompey's senatorial supporters. He quickly gained a significant victory at Thapsus in 46 BC over the forces of Metellus Scipio (who died in the battle) and Cato the Younger (who committed suicide). After this victory, he was appointed Dictator for ten years.

Nevertheless, Pompey's sons Gnaeus Pompeius and Sextus Pompeius, together with Titus Labienus, Caesar's former propraetorian legate (legatus propraetore) and second in command in the Gallic War, escaped to Hispania. Caesar gave chase and defeated the last remnants of opposition in the Battle of Munda in March 45 BC. During this time, Caesar was elected to his third and fourth terms as consul in 46 BC (with Marcus Aemilius Lepidus) and 45 BC (without colleague).

=== Aftermath of the civil war ===
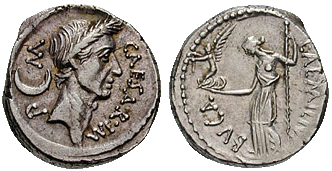
Caesar was the first to print his own bust on a Roman minted coin.

While he was still campaigning in Hispania, the Senate began bestowing honours on Caesar in absentia. Caesar had not proscribed his enemies, instead pardoning almost all, and there was no serious public opposition to him.

Great games and celebrations were held on 21 April to honour Caesar's victory at Munda. Plutarch writes that many Romans found the triumph held following Caesar's victory to be in poor taste, as those defeated in the civil war had not been foreigners, but instead fellow Romans.

On Caesar's return to Italy in September 45 BC, he filed his will, naming his grandnephew Gaius Octavius (Octavian) as the heir to everything, including his name. Caesar also wrote that if Octavian died before Caesar did, Marcus Junius Brutus would be the next heir in succession.

Caesar tightly regulated the purchase of state-subsidised grain and reduced the number of recipients to a fixed number, all of whom were entered into a special register. From 47 to 44 he made plans for the distribution of land to about 15,000 of his veterans.

In 63 BC, Caesar had been elected pontifex maximus, and one of his roles as such was settling the calendar. A complete overhaul of the old Roman calendar proved to be one of his most long lasting and influential reforms. In 46 BC, Caesar established a 365-day year with a leap day every fourth year. (This Julian calendar was subsequently modified by Pope Gregory XIII in 1582 into the modern Gregorian calendar.) As a result of this reform, a certain Roman year (mostly equivalent to 46 BC in the modern calendar) was made 445 days long, to bring the calendar into line with the seasons. The month of July is named after Julius in his honour. The Forum of Caesar, with its Temple of Venus Genetrix, was built among many other public works.

Julius Caesar's planned invasion of the Parthian Empire was to begin in 44 BC, but the Roman dictator's assassination that year prevented the invasion from taking place.

== See also ==
- Julius Caesar's planned invasion of the Parthian Empire
