= Gabiniani =

Roman military unit

The Gabiniani (in English: Gabinians) were 2,000 Roman legionaries and 500 cavalrymen stationed in Egypt by the Roman general Aulus Gabinius after he had reinstated the Pharaoh Ptolemy XII Auletes on the Egyptian throne in 55 BC. The soldiers were left to protect the King, but they soon adopted the manners of their new country and became completely alienated from the Roman Republic. After the death of Auletes in 51 BC, they helped his son Ptolemy XIII in his power struggle against his sister Cleopatra and even involved Julius Caesar, the supporter of Cleopatra, during Caesar's Civil War up to the siege of Alexandria (48–47 BC) in violent battles.

== Protecting power of Ptolemy XII in Egypt ==
In 58 BC, Pharaoh Ptolemy XII "Auletes" had to leave Egypt and went into political exile in Rome due to a popular revolt, and his daughter Berenice IV seized the throne. Three years later, Aulus Gabinius, the Roman proconsul of Roman Syria, restored the king to the throne after a short campaign. Then he left a part of his army, called after him the Gabiniani, in Egypt for the king's protection. These Roman troops also included Gallic and Germanic horsemen.

Because Egypt was nominally independent, the Gabiniani were not a Roman occupying army but mercenaries of Ptolemy XII. According to Julius Caesar, they soon adopted the dissipated way of life of the Alexandrians, while they neglected Roman discipline. Nevertheless, they still possessed a great fighting strength because Caesar described them as very dangerous enemies in the Alexandrian war. They married Egyptian women and had already fathered children with them before the arrival of Caesar in Egypt (48 BC). Over time, they lost their connection with Rome and became a loyal protecting power of Ptolemy XII, who used them in fights against rebellious subjects.

== Conflict with Cleopatra VII ==
After the death of Ptolemy XII (51 BC), his two oldest surviving children, Ptolemy XIII and Cleopatra VII, were supposed to succeed jointly on the throne as husband and wife, but the young queen soon ousted her brother and husband and ruled alone. She quickly came into a serious conflict with the Gabiniani. In 53 BC the powerful Parthians had inflicted a devastating defeat on the Romans in the Battle of Carrhae, and three years later – at the beginning of the year 50 BC – the governor of Syria, Marcus Calpurnius Bibulus, sent two of his sons to Egypt to recruit the Gabiniani for the war against the Parthians. The Gabiniani, however, did not want to give up their comfortable life in the Ptolemaic Empire to fight against the Parthians so they killed Bibulus's sons.

Cleopatra continued the pro-Roman policies of her father. She immediately had the murderers arrested and handed over in chains to Bibulus. This action turned the Gabiniani into bitter enemies of the queen as Cleopatra wanted to maintain good relations with Rome. The Roman historian, Valerius Maximus, claimed that the Syrian proconsul sent the murderers back to Egypt because the senate in Rome, not he, was responsible for the punishment of the criminals, who were still Roman citizens. The German historian Christoph Schäfer did not believe this version and pointed out that the proconsul probably punished the killers instead, since he had the legal authority and had he believed that the murderers could only be judged by the Senate he would not have returned them to Egypt anyway, but to Rome. Schäfer believes that Cleopatra's break with the Gabiniani was the main cause of her subsequent loss of power because her actions led to the mercenaries joining those who supported Ptolemy XIII and his three influential guardians and advisors, Pothinus, Achillas, and Theodotus of Chios.

In the spring of 49 BC, Gnaeus Pompeius, the oldest son of the triumvir, Pompey, came to Egypt to ask for military aid in the civil war against Julius Caesar that had just broken out. At this time Ptolemy XIII had regained equal power with Cleopatra, and both rulers complied with the petition. Among other things, they sent 500 Gabiniani horsemen to Pompey. This time the Gabiniani did not refuse to go to war.

At the end of 49 BC, Cleopatra was driven out of Alexandria at the instigation of Pothinus. Probably in connection with this action, Caesar accused the Gabiniani of being so much used to the old customs of the Alexandrinian soldiers that they demanded the execution of friends of kings, they tried to raise their pay by besieging the palace, and they deposed kings and brought other men to power.

After Pompey's decisive defeat in the Battle of Pharsalus, he fled to the coast of Egypt and demanded help and support from the Ptolemaic government. The advisors of Ptolemy XIII were not willing to get involved in the Roman civil war and decided to murder Pompey in an attempt to please the victorious Caesar. Pothinus and his companions allegedly also feared that Pompey would try to incite the former Roman soldiers in the Ptolemaic army – who had earlier fought under his command – so that he could gain control over Egypt. It is considered unlikely that the Gabiniani could have been convinced to take part in such an action given their close connection to the Egyptian monarchy and community. Indeed two leading members of the Gabiniani, the former tribune Lucius Septimius and the centurion Salvius, participated in the assassination of Pompey (25 July 48 BC according to the Julian calendar).

== War against Caesar ==
Caesar arrived in Egypt a few days after the assassination of Pompey. In spite of the elimination of his enemy, he did not leave the country and supported the expelled Cleopatra in the Ptolemaic power struggle. Pothinus organized military opposition against Caesar. In the Alexandrinian war that followed, the Gabiniani played an important role: they were the core divisions of Achillas' army that comprised 20,000 infantrymen and 2000 cavalrymen. The forces of Caesar were one-fifth the size of his opponent's. Caesar relates in his Commentarii de Bello Civili that fugitive criminals and exiles from the neighbouring Roman provinces had joined the Gabiniani because the government recruited them to swell the ranks of their army.

After the successful conclusion of the Alexandrinian war, Caesar replaced the Gabiniani with three reliable legions, the XXVII, XXVIII and XXIX. These served as the Roman occupying army of Egypt and were tasked with protecting Cleopatra but also to ensure the queen's loyalty to Rome.
