= A Queen for Caesar =

- Directed by: Piero Pierotti; Victor Tourjansky
- Written by: Fulvio Gicca Palli; Arrigo Montanari
- Produced by: Giorgio Venturini; Alberto Chimenz; Pier Ludovico Pavoni
- Starring: Pascale Petit; George Ardisson; Rik Battaglia; Corrado Pani; Franco Volpi; Akim Tamiroff; Gordon Scott
- Cinematography: Angelo Lotti; Pier Ludovico Pavoni
- Edited by: Luciano Cavalieri
- Music by: Michel Michelet
- Production companies: Filmes Roma; C.F.P.C. Parigi
- Release date: 22 December 1962
- Running time: 100 minutes
- Countries: France; Italy
- Language: Italian

A Queen for Caesar (Italian: Una regina per Cesare, French: Cléopâtre une reine pour César) is a 1962 Italian-French historical drama film directed by Piero Pierotti and Victor Tourjansky. Unlike other films about Caesar and Cleopatra, this film focuses entirely on the dynastic struggle within Egypt leading up to the arrival of Caesar, and in fact, we only see him in the closing scene of the film when he arrives at the Ptolemaic palace in Alexandria. Set in Egypt in 48 BC, it stars Pascale Petit as Cleopatra, George Ardisson as Achillas, Rik Battaglia as Lucius Septimius, Corrado Pani as Ptolemy XIII, Franco Volpi as Apollodorus, Akim Tamiroff as Pompey, and Gordon Scott as Julius Caesar.

This film was shot at the Incir De Paolis Studios in Rome. 20th Century Fox bought the rights for the film to keep it out of release lest it compete with their own Elizabeth Taylor Cleopatra.

== Cast ==
- Pascale Petit as Cleopatra
- George Ardisson as Achillas
- Rik Battaglia as Lucius Septimius
- Akim Tamiroff as Gnaeus Pompeius
- Gordon Scott as Julius Caesar
- Corrado Pani as Ptolemy
- Franco Volpi as Apollodorus
- Ennio Balbo as Theodotus
- Nerio Bernardi as Scaurus
- Aurora de Alba as Rabis
- Nando Angelini as Sextus Pompeius
- Nino Marchetti as Pompey's messenger

== Production ==
Budgeted at a few hundred thousand dollars, A Queen for Caesar was completed before the release of Fox's Cleopatra.

In a 2025 interview, Pascale Petit remembered the making of the film: "It's a wonderful memory. I'm a huge fan of Antiquity, and it just so happens that the woman I admire most in the world is Cleopatra. So, as an actress, I was honored to portray her on screen. The filming took place in a studio in Rome, like the Cleopatra film with Elizabeth Taylor. The Italians had even bought some of the sets and costumes. I had some absolutely stunning custom-made dresses. I've never looked as beautiful as I did in that film. Besides, Egypt is truly my passion. I went there, and before that, I spent a year reading everything I could find about the country. I also discovered that there are quite a few inaccuracies between the historical events and the film. But that's cinema!"

== Reception ==
In July 1963, a New York columnist reported that A Queen for Caesar was packing a centrally located movie theater on the Champs-Élysées in Paris every day.

The book Movies on TV, 1986-1987 includes a positive review of the film: "Another Cleopatra tale as the beauteous princess challenges her brother for the throne. The alluring Miss Petit and some good production values rate this historical drama slightly better than the usual."

== See also ==
- List of historical drama films
- List of films set in ancient Rome
- Cleopatra VII
- Ptolemaic dynasty
- History of Ptolemaic Egypt
- 1st century BC
