= Serapion (strategos) =

Serapion (Ancient Greek: Σεραπίων; possibly died 41 BC) was strategos of Cyprus and an admiral of the Ptolemaic navy in 43 BC, during the reign of Cleopatra. Against the intention of the Egyptian queen, he supported Gaius Cassius Longinus in the Liberators' civil war against Mark Antony and Octavian, but had to take refuge in Tyre and was handed over to Cleopatra in 41 BC. He may have been the same Serapion, who was instructed by Julius Caesar to negotiate with the Egyptian commander Achillas in 48 BC.

== Life ==
When Caesar sided with Cleopatra in her dispute with her brother Ptolemy XIII, the minister Pothinus ordered Achillas to march with his strong army from Pelusium to Alexandria (autumn 48 BC). Because Caesar did not have enough soldiers for an open battle he forced Ptolemy XIII to send two negotiators of high rank to Achillas. Serapion and Dioscurides were chosen for this task, both of whom had already been ambassadors of Ptolemy XII in Rome and now had to inform Achillas that Ptolemy XIII did not want the Egyptian general to fight against Caesar. But Achillas realized that the young king had been compelled to send this message and stirred up the animosity of his soldiers against Serapion and Dioscurides. One of the two negotiators was killed and the other seriously wounded but he survived because he was taken to be dead.

The sources do not say which of the two ambassadors survived. If it was Serapion, he was probably the same Serapion as the strategos of Cyprus who is attested in 43 BC. Then, one year after the assassination of Caesar, his followers and enemies fought one another. In this war Cleopatra sided with the party of the Caesarians. So when Cassius asked the Egyptian queen for support she excused herself that she was allegedly not able to help him because her country had been afflicted by a plague and a famine. But Serapion handed over his fleet to the assassin of Caesar without consultation of Cleopatra. The ships, that Serapion and some cities, such as Tyre, had sent, enabled Cassius to decisively beat the Caesarian general Publius Cornelius Dolabella (July 43 BC). Cleopatra was very indignant about the unauthorized behaviour of her governor.

The historian Michael Grant believes that Serapion tried to support Arsinoe IV, who was then living in exile in the temple of Artemis in Ephesus, against her older hostile sister Cleopatra and perhaps even wanted to make her the new queen of Egypt. When Cleopatra won the favour of Mark Antony after the victory of the Caesarians she used the power of the triumvir to take revenge on her enemies (41 BC). Serapion and Arsinoe IV were among her victims. He had taken refuge in Tyre but Antony ordered that he had to be handed over to Cleopatra. Some scholars suggest it's very probable that she had him executed.

== Bibliography ==
- Michael Grant, Cleopatra, 1972 and 1974, German edition 1998, pp. 102, 146, 172.
- Christoph Schäfer, Kleopatra, 2006, pp. 63, 118, 131.
