= Caesar and Cleopatra (film) =

1945 film by Gabriel Pascal

- Theatrical release poster
- Directed by: Gabriel Pascal
- Screenplay by: George Bernard Shaw; Marjorie Deans
- Based on: Caesar and Cleopatra; 1901 play by George Bernard Shaw
- Produced by: Gabriel Pascal
- Starring: Vivien Leigh; Claude Rains; Stewart Granger; Flora Robson; Francis L. Sullivan
- Cinematography: F. A. Young; Robert Krasker; Jack Hildyard; Jack Cardiff
- Edited by: Frederick Wilson
- Music by: Georges Auric
- Production company: Gabriel Pascal Productions
- Distributed by: Eagle-Lion Films (UK); United Artists (US)
- Release dates: 11 December 1945 (London); 6 September 1946 (U.S.); 16 September 1946 (UK)
- Running time: 128 minutes (UK); 123 minutes (US)
- Country: United Kingdom
- Language: English
- Budget: £1.3 million
- Box office: £1 million

Caesar and Cleopatra is a 1945 British historical romantic film directed by Gabriel Pascal which was a film adaptation of George Bernard Shaw's 1901 play of the same title. The film stars Vivien Leigh and Claude Rains in the title roles. Some scenes were directed by Brian Desmond Hurst, who took no formal credit. The picture was produced by Independent Producers and Pascal Film Productions and distributed by Eagle-Lion Distributors.

Upon release, Caesar and Cleopatra failed to earn back its colossal budget. John Bryan was nominated for an Oscar for Best Art Direction.

== Plot ==
It is a largely-faithful adaptation of Shaw's play, with no significant cuts or alterations to the original text.

In 48 BC, Julius Caesar (Claude Rains) arrives in Egypt and, while wandering the desert at night, discovers the teenage Cleopatra (Vivien Leigh) hiding between the paws of a Sphinx. Unaware of his identity, Cleopatra treats him as a kindly old man and confesses her terror of the invading Romans. Caesar encourages her to find her courage so she may rule as a queen. After escorting her back to the palace, Caesar is greeted by his legions which makes Cleopatra realizes who he is and collapses into his arms in relief. At the palace in Alexandria, Caesar meets Cleopatra’s younger brother and rival for the throne, King Ptolemy (Anthony Harvey), along with his guardian Pothinus (Francis L. Sullivan). Caesar demands a large tribute and decrees that the siblings must reign jointly. The Egyptians reject the proposal and threaten military action. Caesar orders his aide, Rufio (Basil Sydney), to seize the Pharos lighthouse. While Caesar allows Ptolemy’s court to depart freely, Cleopatra and Pothinus remain with the Romans. As the Siege of Alexandria begins, Cleopatra manages to smuggle herself through the blockades to Caesar’s position at the lighthouse by hiding inside a rolled-up carpet. When the lighthouse is attacked by Egyptian forces, Caesar and his entourage, including his secretary Britannus (Cecil Parker) and Apollodorus (Stewart Granger), are forced to dive into the harbor and swim to a Roman ship, with Cleopatra clinging to Caesar as they escape. Six months later, with the Romans still besieged in the palace, Pothinus attempts to undermine Cleopatra by telling Caesar that she is a traitress who is merely using Rome to secure her power. Caesar dismisses the claim as common political ambition, but a vengeful Cleopatra secretly orders her nurse, Ftatateeta (Flora Robson), to assassinate Pothinus. The murder incites a riot among the Egyptian populace, who begin storming the palace. While Caesar departs to lead a counter-offensive, Rufio discovers Ftatateeta’s role in the assassination and kills her. Cleopatra later discovers her nurse’s body hidden behind a curtain.Following the total defeat of Ptolemy's forces and the King’s death by drowning in the Nile, Caesar prepares to return to Rome. He appoints Rufio as the governor of the province. Cleopatra appears in mourning for Ftatateeta and accuses Rufio of murder. Caesar defends Rufio's actions, asserting that the killing was a pragmatic necessity rather than an act of malice. Though resentful, Cleopatra is pacified when Caesar promises to send the young commander Mark Antony to Egypt. Caesar sets sail for Rome, leaving Cleopatra to rule Egypt alone.

== Cast ==
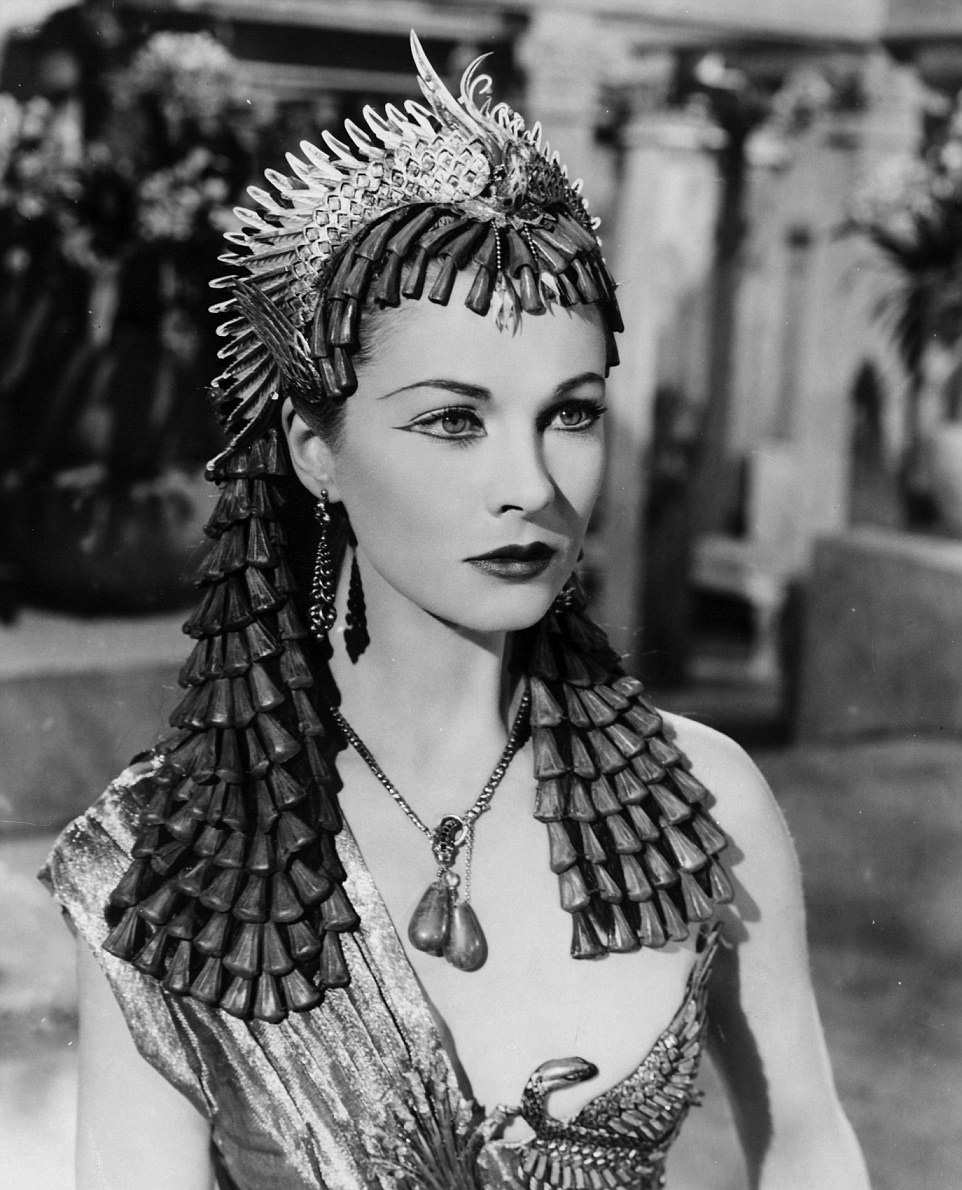
Vivien Leigh as Cleopatra

- Vivien Leigh as Cleopatra
- Claude Rains as Caesar
- Stewart Granger as Apollodorus
- Flora Robson as Ftatateeta
- Francis L. Sullivan as Pothinus
- Basil Sydney as Rufio
- Cecil Parker as Britannus
- Raymond Lovell as Lucius Septimus
- Anthony Eustrel as Achillas
- Ernest Thesiger as Theodotus
- Anthony Harvey as Ptolemy
- Robert Adams as Nubian Slave
- Gerald Case as a Roman Tax Officer
- Olga Edwardes as Cleopatra's Lady Attendant
- Harda Swanhilde as Cleopatra's Lady Attendant
- Michael Rennie as 1st Centurion
- James McKechnie as 2nd Centurion
- Esmé Percy as Major Domo
- Stanley Holloway as Belzanor
- Leo Genn as Bel Affris
- Alan Wheatley as Persian
- Anthony Holles as Boatman
- Charles Victor as 1st Porter
- Ronald Shiner as 2nd Porter
- John Bryning as Sentinel
- John Laurie as 1st Auxiliary Sentinel
- Charles Rolfe as 2nd Auxiliary Sentinel
- Felix Aylmer as 1st Nobleman
- Ivor Barnard as 2nd Nobleman
- Valentine Dyall as 1st Guardsman
- Charles Deane as 2nd Guardsman

== Production ==
Filmed in Technicolor with lavish sets, the production was reported to be the most expensive film ever made at the time, costing £1,278,000 (or £61.8 million at 2024 value), or US$5.15 million (or US$70.9 million at inflation-adjusted value) at contemporary exchange rates. Caesar and Cleopatra held that record until Duel in the Sun was produced in 1946.

Director Gabriel Pascal ordered sand from Egypt in order to achieve the proper cinematic colour. The production ran into delays because of wartime restrictions. Several members of the British aristocracy who were known to frequent the Mayfair nightclub scene were recruited for crowd scenes, apparently because taking extra work had become something of a fad; this practice was protested by professional film extras associated with The Film Artists' Association. During the shoot, Vivien Leigh, who was pregnant, tripped and suffered a miscarriage. The incident triggered Leigh's manic depression, leading to her emotional breakdown, and halted production for five weeks.

Pascal joined the Film Extras Union to make a cameo appearance in the film, leading a camel.

It was the first Shaw film made in colour, and the last film version of a Shaw play during his lifetime. After Shaw's death in 1950, Pascal produced Androcles and the Lion, another Shaw-derived film, in 1952.

== Reception ==
=== Box office ===
The film was described as a "box office stinker" at the time and almost ended Pascal's career.

According to trade papers, the film was a "notable box office attraction" at British cinemas. Variety estimated in October 1946 that it was expected to gross £350,000 ($1.4 million) in the United Kingdom. According to Kinematograph Weekly, the top British box-office draw for 1946 was The Wicked Lady.

United Artists estimated that the film had grossed US$2,500,000 in the United States by October 1946, making it one of the more popular British films ever released there, but the film's receipts fell short of initial expectations.. The estimated gross in the rest of the world was $400,000, including 815,007 admissions in France, giving a total estimated worldwide gross of $4.3 million (£1,075,000).

Variety estimated that Rank lost $3 million (£750,000) (or £36.3 million at 2024 value) on the film after marketing, distribution, prints, insurance rights, and wages were taken into account. Another account says the loss was even higher at £981,678.

== See also ==
- Cultural depictions of Julius Caesar
- Cultural depictions of Cleopatra VII
