= Alexandrian war =

Caesar's intervention in Egypt during his civil war

The Alexandrian war, also called the Alexandrine war, was a phase of Caesar's civil war in which Julius Caesar involved himself in an Egyptian dynastic struggle. Caesar attempted to mediate a succession dispute between Cleopatra and Ptolemy XIII and exact repayment of certain Egyptian debts.

Arriving in Alexandria in October 48 BC and seeking initially to apprehend Pompey, his enemy in the civil war, Caesar found that Pompey had been assassinated by Ptolemy XIII's men. Caesar's financial demands and high-handedness then triggered a conflict which put him under siege in Alexandria's palace quarter. Only after external intervention from a Roman client state were Caesar's forces relieved. In the aftermath of Caesar's victory at the Battle of the Nile and Ptolemy XIII's death, Caesar installed his mistress Cleopatra as Egyptian queen, with her younger brother as co-monarch.

== Background ==
=== Egyptian dynastic struggle ===
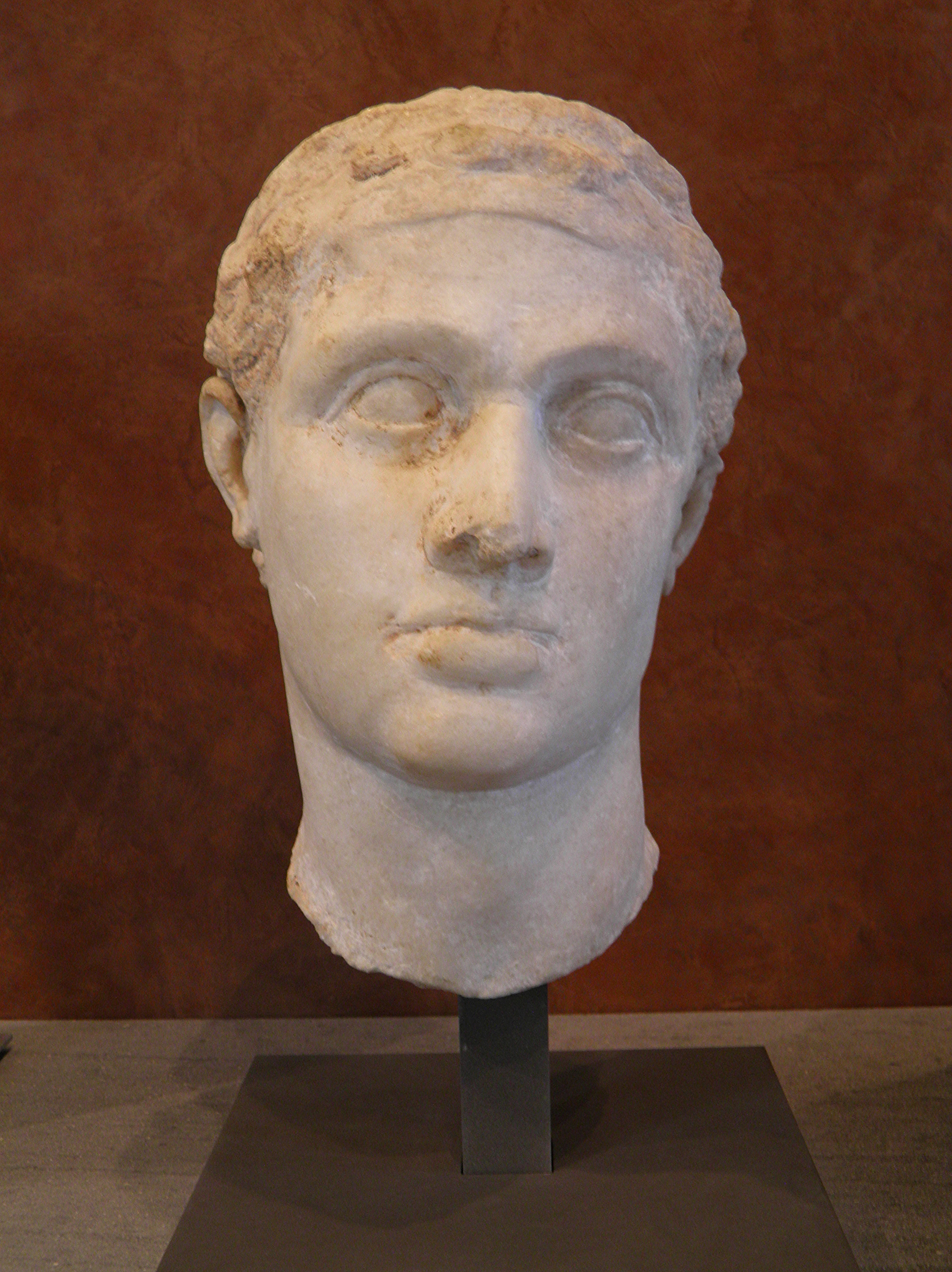
Depiction of Ptolemy XII Auletes.

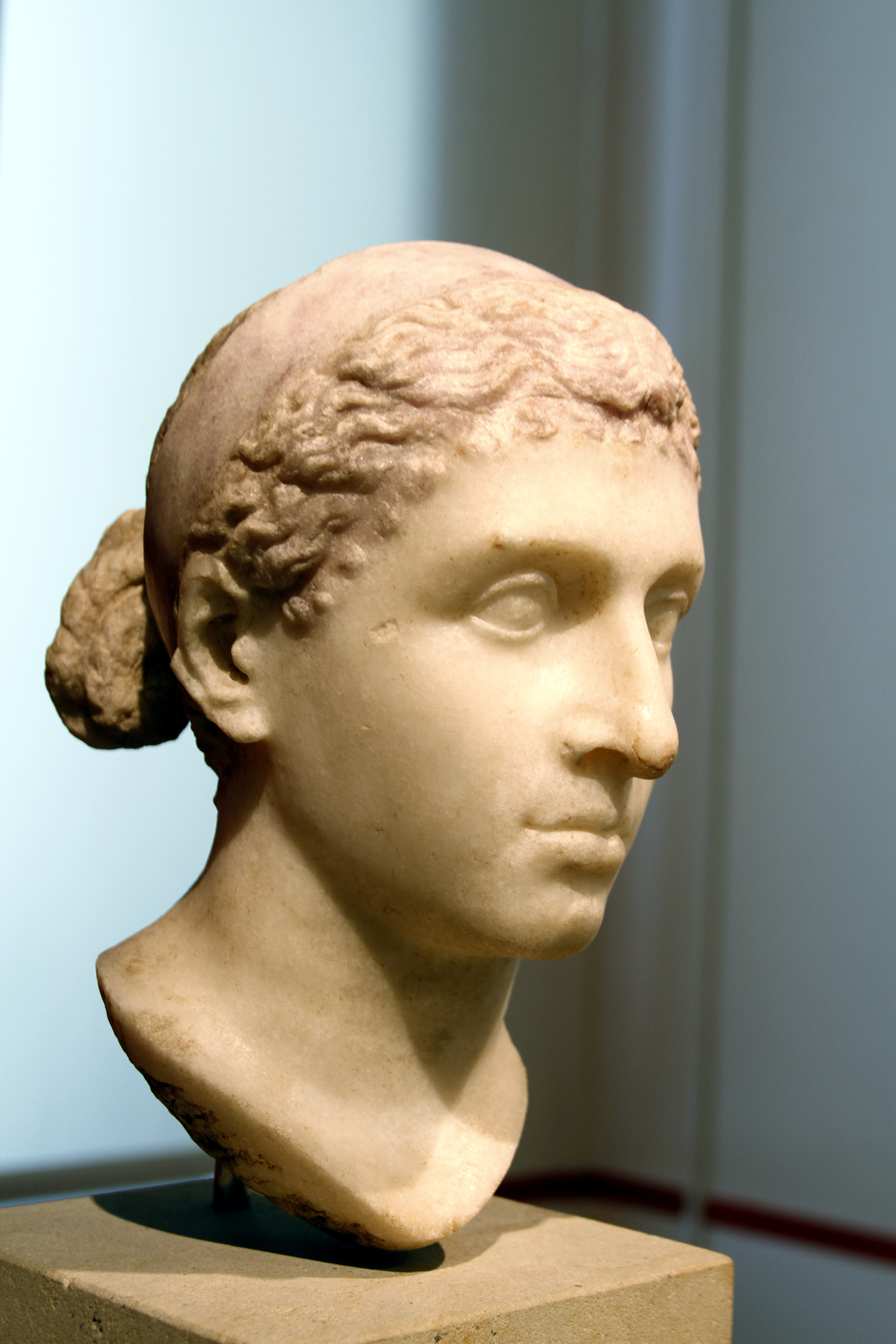
Depiction of Cleopatra VII, one of the participants in the dynastic struggle after Ptolemy XII Auletes' death in 51 BC.

Ptolemaic Egypt had been in a period of dynastic instability and domestic unrest, including native rebellions against the Hellenistic Ptolemies, for decades prior to the installment of Ptolemy XI Alexander II in 81 BC by Sulla. This instability and violence was caused by racial, regional, religious, and economic factors. Internecine conflict between royal claimants, resentment of Roman interference by the Alexandrians, and Roman interventionism, further contributed to the kingdom's decline. In 75 BC, Egyptian Cyrenaica was annexed by Rome. In later years, Egypt tried to placate powerful Roman generals in the east during the Third Mithridatic War, such as Lucullus and Pompey.

Ptolemy XII Auletes' rule was regularly challenged both by domestic rebellion and by other claimants requesting Roman support for their own claims against him. Auletes attempted to cultivate good relations with Egyptian priests, tried to recentre religious practice around himself as a unifying force, and seek Roman support for his rule. During Caesar's first consulship in 59 BC, he gave an enormous bribe to Caesar and Pompey to receive an official declaration that he was a Roman "friend and ally". His seeking of Roman friendship was possibly in response to abortive Roman attempts to vassalise the rich kingdom in 65 BC.

When Egyptian Cyprus was annexed by Rome in 58 BC, Auletes was driven from his throne by an Alexandrian mob. Cyprus itself was annexed at the initiative of Publius Clodius Pulcher, who appointed Marcus Porcius Cato as proquaestor pro praetore to liquidate the island's wealth, likely to fund a Roman grain project; Auletes' younger brother, who was king there, killed himself in preference to submission. Driven from his throne and replaced by his daughter, Berenice IV, Auletes travelled to Rome, where he pled his case with Pompey's support. After apparent threat to his personal safety, he travelled to Ephesus where he sought sanctuary at the temple of Artemis.

The consul of 57, Publius Cornelius Lentulus Spinther, was supposed to lead an army to restore Ptolemy, but Roman intervention was forestalled by a Sibylline oracle warning against deployment of an army. Further Roman debates in 56 BC on whether to intervene and, if so, who to send, were bitter and inconclusive. (Note: The senate debated the topic on 13 January 56 BC: The senate voted overwhelmingly against use of military force.; Publius Servilius Isauricus proposed not restoring Ptolemy XII.; Bibulus proposed sending three senators without imperium to mediate (excluding Pompey).; Crassus proposed sending three senators with imperium to mediate.; Quintus Hortensius, Cicero, and Marcus Lucullus proposed sending Lentulus Spinther.; Lucius Volcacius Tullus, supported by Lucius Afranius and Pompey's allies, proposed sending Pompey.; Bibulus' proposal was defeated. Hortensius' proposal was vetoed. After a delay, one tribune proposed recalling Spinther (then governor in Cilicia); another tribune proposed sending Pompey; Clodius' supporters then proposed sending Crassus. After a consul put all tribunician proposals on hold by declaring public holidays; one tribune threatened to veto the elections. Eventually, Isauricus' proposal received senatorial approval, but was then vetoed.) But after the irregular and contested election of Pompey and Crassus to a joint consulship in 55 BC, the governor of Syria – Aulus Gabinius – received a massive ten thousand talent bribe from Auletes and illegally left his province with his army to overthrow Berenice and install Auletes back to the throne. Many Roman troops, called the Gabiniani, stayed in Egypt to support the Ptolemaic dynasty and occupy the country.

Auletes' return was marked with the murder of his daughter and her supporters. Gabinius, upon the expiration of his command, was successfully prosecuted for corruption and sent into exile; Gabinius protested that he had marched out of fear of Berenice's husband's fleet turning piratical, which was seemingly disbelieved. When Auletes was unable to make payment on his bribes, he appointed a Roman representative, Gaius Rabirius Postumus, to exact the appropriate monies, but Rabirius was driven from the kingdom by a mob. When Marcus Calpurnius Bibulus, as governor of Syria, sent his sons as ambassadors to recall the Gabiniani to defend against a possible Parthian counter-invasion in 50 BC, they were killed.

Upon Auletes' death in 51 BC, he left the kingdom to his son and daughter, Ptolemy XIII and Cleopatra (aged ten and seventeen, respectively). The appropriate will was deposited in the Roman state treasury and named the Roman people as guarantors. A power struggle promptly began between Ptolemy XIII and Cleopatra, with Cleopatra attempting to find support from the common Egyptian people: she was the first of the Ptolemies to speak Egyptian and spent money freely to support traditional Egyptian religious cults. Ptolemy XIII's regents, Pothinus and Achillas, led the cause against her.

=== Caesar's arrival ===
After Caesar's successful invasion of Macedonia and victory at Pharsalus in 48 BC, he put Pompey to flight across the Mediterranean. Pompey and his family fled first to Lesbos and thence to Alexandria in Ptolemaic Egypt; the new child king of Egypt, Ptolemy XIII, had likely been recognised by the Pompeian senate-in-exile and given Pompey as a guardian. When he landed at Pelusium, he was assassinated by two Roman officers who were part of Gabinius' garrison. Caesar arrived and learnt of the death of Pompey, his former son-in-law, three days later on 2 October.

== Siege of Alexandria ==
Map of the city of Alexandria c. 30 BC, according to Otto Puchstein, a 19th century German archaeologist.

After arrival to Alexandria, Caesar's forces seemed to have been kept there by unfavourable winds. With some time available and huge financial demands, he demanded payment of some 10 million denarii of the bribes promised to him during his consulship in 59 BC. He also announced that he would arbitrate the succession dispute between Ptolemy XIII and Cleopatra.

Pothinus, the eunuch serving as regent for Ptolemy XIII, sent secret orders to Achillas to summon his army of some 20,000 men to Alexandria. They promptly besieged Caesar in the palace compound. After a short truce, Achillas launched an all-out attack. In repulsing one of these attacks, Caesar's men set a fire which some sources say spread to and destroyed the Library of Alexandria. Caesar sent messengers requesting aid, but it would take some time for it to arrive.

At the start of the siege, the ostensible enemy leaders were present with Caesar in the palace compound. Cleopatra smuggled herself into the compound to meet with Caesar, aided by a manservant who rowed her across Alexandria's harbour while hidden in a laundry bag. Cassius Dio claims that the queen intentionally seduced Caesar; regardless, the two quickly became lovers and Caesar then declared that Auletes' will required Ptolemy XIII and Cleopatra to be joint rulers. After Pothinus was discovered to be communicating with the besiegers, he was executed. Arsinoe escaped and joined the Egyptian army, which proclaimed her queen, and then assassinated Achillas to take control of the force. Amid rumours of a plot to poison Caesar, he took to drink with his officers.

The first reinforcements were former Pompeians making their way by sea. Caesar's men then fought a series of small naval battles to maintain control of the harbour and the possibility of resupply thereby. While suffering a setback in a defeat in the harbour where his men were routed to the sea before drowning by the hundreds, Caesar's forces maintained some control of the harbour.

In late January or early February 47 BC, a deputation of Alexandrians asked Caesar to let Ptolemy XIII go. He did so in the hopes that Ptolemy XIII would call off the besiegers. He did not. After renewed assaults on Caesar's positions, a relief army from Syria came overland led by Mithridates of Pergamum and aided by 3,000 Jews contributed by High Priest Hyrcanus II and led by Antipater. After the relief army stormed Pelusium, the Ptolemies sent most of their forces to contest the crossing of the Nile delta. Caesar moved his men by sea to join with the relief army, leading to the Battle of the Nile.

== Battle of the Nile ==
After Caesar's arrival to Mithridates camp, Caesar and Ptolemy's forces engaged over across a Nile tributary. Bellum Alexandrinum – usually ascribed to Aulus Hirtius – relates that Caesar's Germanic auxiliary cavalry acquitted themselves well in running down Ptolemy's light infantry as Caesar's heavy infantry crossed the river on a makeshift bridge, causing much of Ptolemy's army to rout. After the victory, the narrative reports Caesar came upon Ptolemy's camp and besieged it. Continuing, Caesar reported attempted to take it by storm but failed, before discovering and exploiting a weak spot in the camp's defences, leading to a successful attack on that spot which forced Ptolemy's garrison to flight. In the flight, Ptolemy's ship reportedly capsized and he drowned.

== Settlement ==
After the defeat of Ptolemy XIII's forces, Caesar remained in Egypt for some time. While Bellum Alexandrinum "gives the impression that... Caesar left Egypt almost immediately", many modern scholars believe he remained there until June or July, possibly holidaying on the Nile with Cleopatra.

Caesar departed due to news of Pharnaces II's invasion of Roman Asia. He left Cleopatra and Ptolemy XIV Philopator (Cleopatra's yet-younger brother) to rule Egypt with the support of three legions. He also ceded Cyprus to Egypt. Around June, Cleopatra bore Caesarion, whom Caesar believed to be his child (contra Octavian's later protests).
