= Lucius Septimius (Roman governor) =

4th century AD Roman governor in Britain

Lucius Septimius (the rest of his name is unknown) was a governor of Britannia Prima, a province of Roman Britain during the later fourth century AD.

He is known only from a dedication to Jupiter on a column base he made at Cirencester. The dedication is most likely to date between AD 360 and 380, perhaps during the reign of the emperor Julian who was a pagan himself although no more precise dating can be attributed. It shows that non-Christian beliefs were still held by people of importance despite the growth of Christianity in the empire at the time.

The inscription reads:

To Jupiter, Best and Greatest, His Perfection Lucius Septimius . . ., governor of Britannia Prima, restored [this monument], being a citizen of Rheims. This statue and column erected under the ancient religion Septimius restores, ruler of Britannia Prima.
