= Siege of Alexandria (47 BC) =

Part of the Alexandrian War, Caesar vs Ptolemy XIII

- Part of Alexandrine Civil War
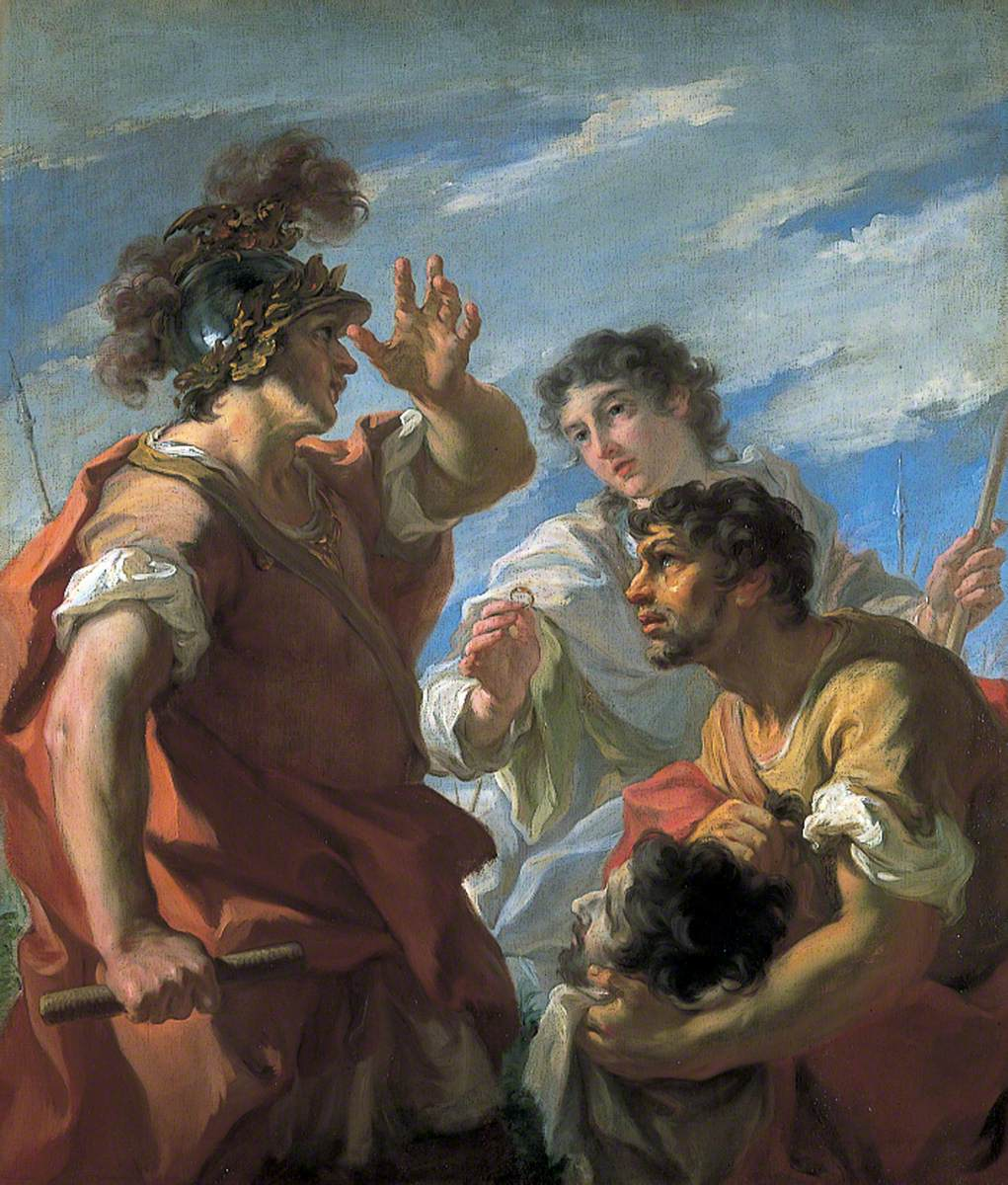
- Caesar before Alexandria, a work by Giovanni Antonio Pellegrini (1675–1741), showing Julius Caesar upset by the death of Pompey the Great, the work is in the Birmingham Museum and Art Gallery, England.
Date	late 48 BC – early or mid 47 BC
Location	Alexandria, Ptolemaic Egypt (modern Egypt) 31°12′00″N 29°55′00″E
Result	Roman victory

Belligerents
Roman Republic	Ptolemaic Kingdom

Commanders and leaders
Julius Caesar; Cleopatra VII; Euphranor †	Ptolemy XIII; Achillas (executed); Arsinoe IV (POW); Ganymedes; Pothinus (executed)

Strength
Initially: 3,200 infantry 800 cavalry Elements of Legio VI and Legio XXVII After reinforcements: 8,000 infantry 800 cavalry 19 warships and 15 smaller vessels Reinforcements: 1 full legion (Legio XXXVI)	20,000 infantry 2,000 cavalry An unknown number of militia 27 warships

Casualties and losses
Unknown	Unknown
- Location within Egypt

The siege of Alexandria was a series of skirmishes and battles occurring between the forces of Julius Caesar, Cleopatra VII, Arsinoe IV, and Ptolemy XIII, between 48 and 47 BC. During this time Caesar was engaged in a civil war against remaining Republican forces.

The siege was lifted by relief forces arriving from Syria. After a battle contesting those forces' crossing of the Nile delta, Ptolemy XIII and Arsinoe's forces were defeated.

== Prelude ==
After the Battle of Pharsalus, Pompey abandoned his defeated army and fled with his advisors overseas to Mytilene and then to Cilicia where he held a council of war. Pompey's council of war decided to flee to Egypt, which had in the previous year supplied him with military aid.

His arrival in Egypt coincided with political tension between King Ptolemy XIII Theos Philopator and his sister Queen Cleopatra. After the death of their father, Ptolemy XII Auletes, the pair were decided to co-rule Egypt as was stated in Ptolemy XII's will. Cleopatra, however, was accused of wanting to remove her brother from power by Ptolemy XIII's advisors the eunuch Pothinus, Theodotus of Chios, and Achillas, who urged Ptolemy to remove her. Cleopatra was exiled and Ptolemy acted as Egypt's sole ruler.

Though Pompey had once found allyship and aid in Alexandria, after his defeat to Caesar at the Battle of Pharsalus, Ptolemy and his advisors seemingly changed their opinion on supporting him. Recognizing the opportunity to gain Julius Caesar's favor, upon his arrival in Egypt, Pompey was murdered by Achillas and Lucius Septimius (former soldiers in his army) under the orders of the eunuch Pothinus and Theodotus of Chios. They believed Caesar would be pleased by the removal of his adversary.

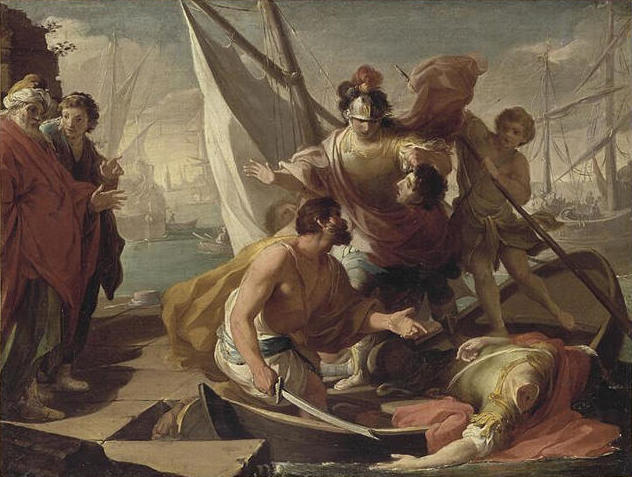
The Death of Pompey by anonymous, showing the scene of the assassination of Pompey by Achillas.

Caesar landed in Alexandria three days after Pompey's death with some three thousand men and eight hundred Germanic auxiliary horses, occupying parts of the Alexandrian royal quarter. Ptolemy had Caesar presented with Pompey’s severed head to which Caesar turned away in horror. He was also presented with Pompey’s signet ring, which he accepted. Caesar was said to have become overwhelmed with grief and wept for his one-time ally and son-in-law. This display of emotion has been interpreted differently by historians as to whether or not it was legitimate. Historian Cassius Dio claimed Caesar's sorrow was insincere– citing Caesar's long-standing hatred for Pompey, claiming even that Pompey had been Caesars “antagonist and rival,” therefore his display of remorse was ingenuine. Regardless of his true feelings towards the death of Pompey, he demanded a ten million denarii payment towards a debt of Ptolemy's father, Ptolemy XII Auletes, and declared his intention to mediate the dispute between Ptolemy and his sister Cleopatra VII.

== Start of the siege ==
Caesar's claim to settle the ruling dispute initially seemed to be moderately accepted, however it would soon be uncovered that there was some backlash to this decision.

After the payment demand, Pothinus, who acted as regent for Ptolemy (who at the time was no older than fourteen) sent secret orders summoning Achillas and an army of some twenty thousand men to Alexandria. The ongoing Roman Civil War limited the amount of men Julius Caesar had available to him in Alexandria which created an imbalance between the Roman and Alexandrian forces. Caesar, seeing he was outnumbered by Achillas's forces, confined himself to the Royal Quarter.

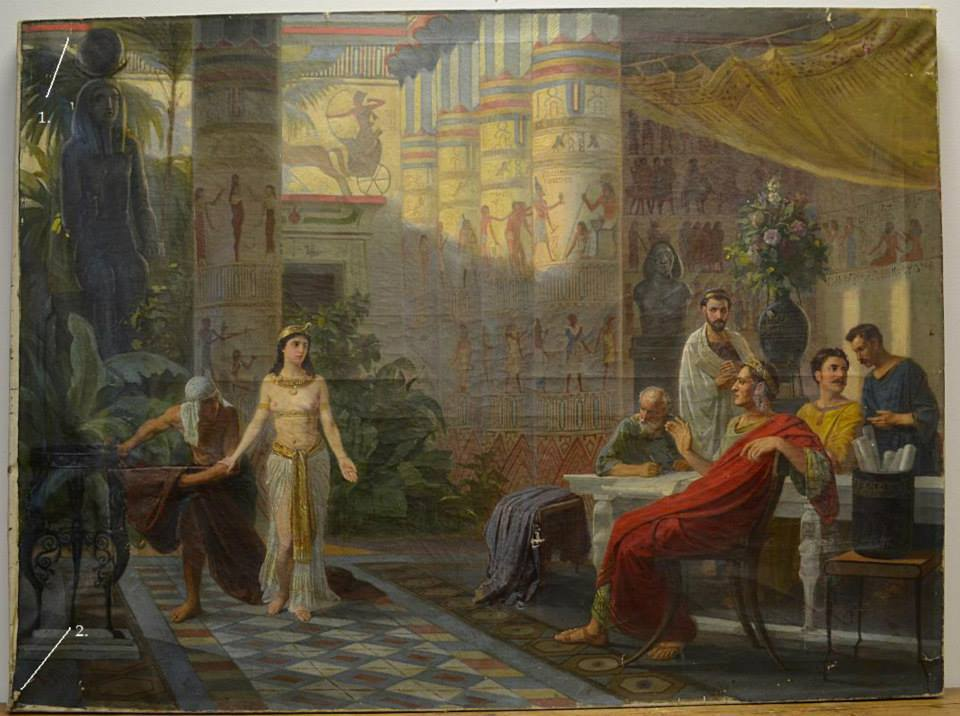
Julius Caesar and Cleopatra, an oil painting by Carl Gottlieb Venig depicting their meeting in Egypt. The painting is a part of the Narva Museum Foundation.

At this point, Cleopatra, aware of Caesars disposition towards women, requested to be granted an audience with him, pleading that her friends were betraying her. In the company of her servant Apollodorus of Rhodes, she secreted herself into the royal quarter concealed by a laundry bag. Upon meeting with her, Caesar became infatuated with her, eventually becoming Cleopatra's lover.

Soon after their meeting, Caesar publicly declared that he would honor Ptolemy XII Auletes's will to invest both Cleopatra and Ptolemy to have joint rule over the kingdom. Ptolemy was blindsided by the meeting of Cleopatra and Caesar and became enraged at the event. In his anger, he threw off the diadem from his head and began to proclaim that he had been betrayed. This action began to instigate riots among the Alexandrians causing the palace to be assaulted, "by land and sea." These riots were temporarily quelled when the will of King Ptolemy XII was read aloud by Caesar, reinforcing the idea that the two should rule together and that Rome would hold guardianship over them.

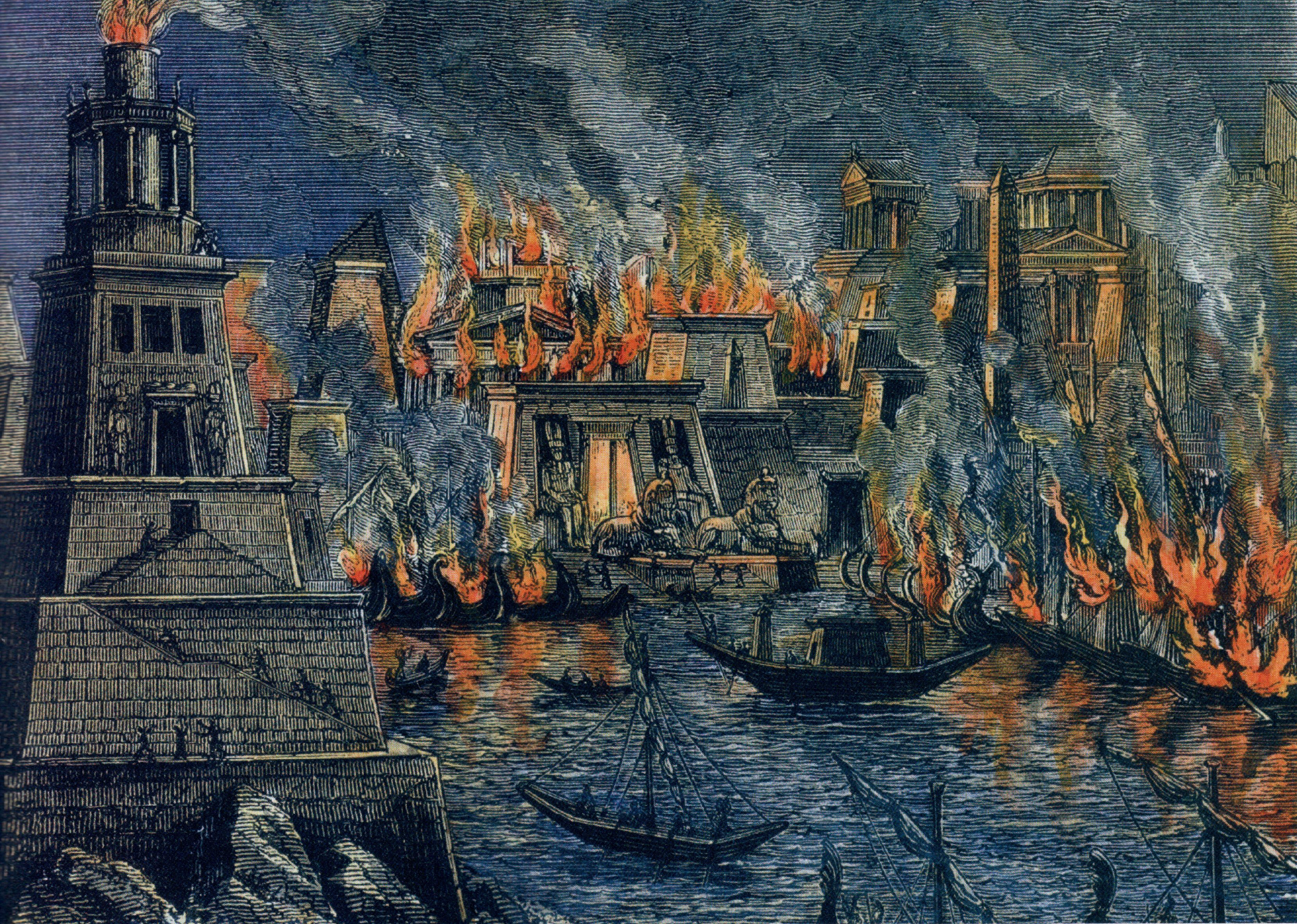
The Fire of Alexandria by Herman Goll in 1876. Painting shows the burning of Alexandria during the siege.

Becoming uneasy with the building tension, Caesar sent men to meet Achillas in the name of Ptolemy, encouraging him to keep the peace. Achillas, finding out that these men were actually sent by Caesar, became filled with contempt at the ploy, finding Caesar to be afraid. This led him to rouse his soldiers, inspiring them to favor Ptolemy over Cleopatra and Caesar. One of the messengers would be killed by Achillas while the other was, "nearly done to death."

After this, Achillas would besiege and then launch an all-out attack on the Royal Quarter. Initial fighting was fierce, and with little reinforcements available to him, Caesar set fire to the Ptolemaic boats in the harbor as a distraction, and sent a detachment to the island of Pharos to maintain control of the harbor. The fire would eventually spread to the Mouseíon (“Museum”) Foundation, parts of the palace and to the Great Library in the process. Roman historian Livy claimed that up to 40,000 volumes of books and papyrus scrolls could have been burned and destroyed in this fire.

== During the siege ==
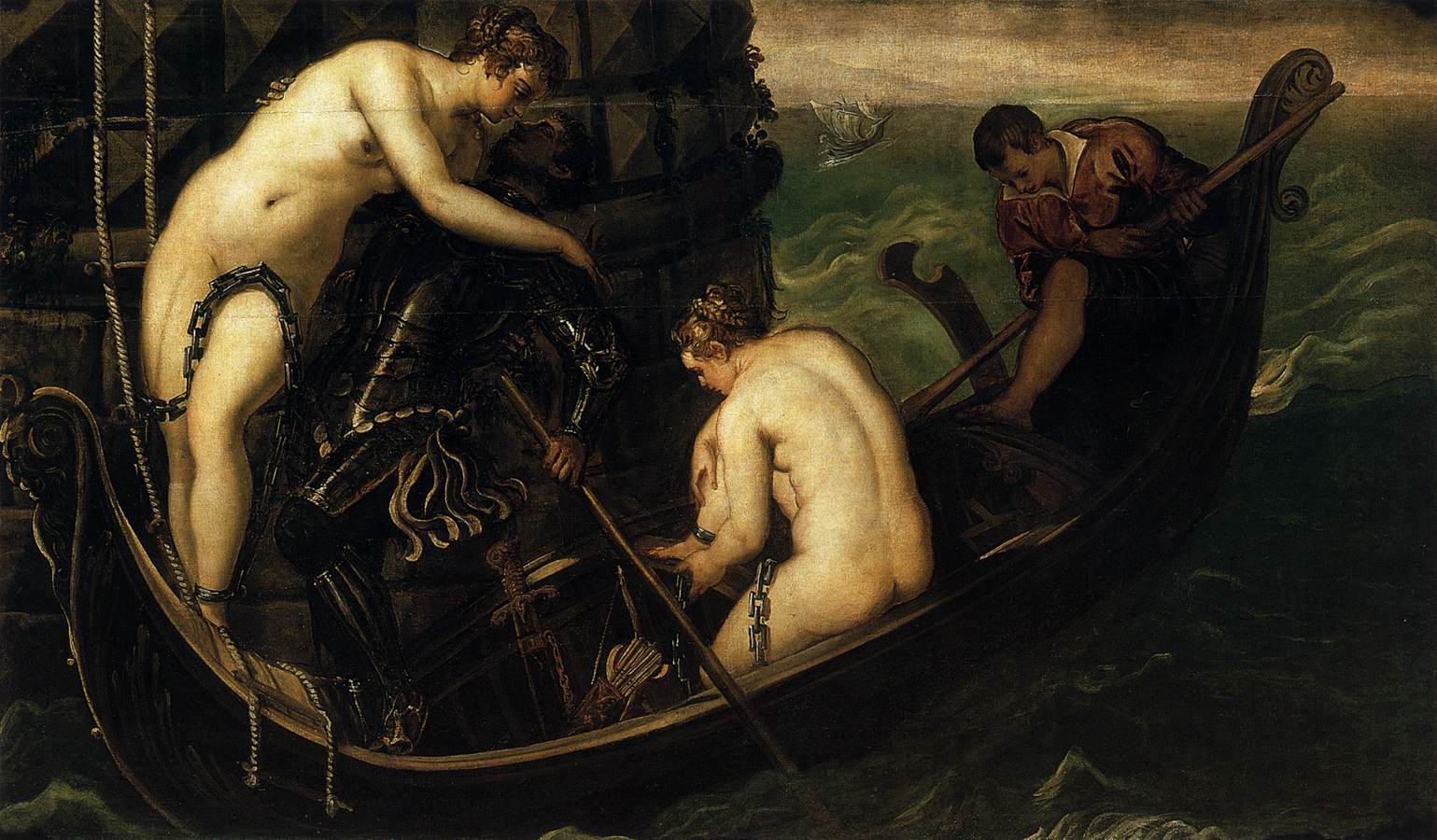
The Liberation of Arsinoe, by Jacopo Tintoretto (1519-1594). Scene shows Arsinoe IV fleeing Alexandria after the arrival of Caesar.

Cleopatra, Arsinoe IV (the younger sister of Ptolemy) along with their younger brother Ptolemy XIV, were all in Caesars possession at the royal quarters during the start of the siege as his "guests". Arsinoe managed to escape from Caesar with her eunuch tutor Ganymede as she was not well guarded. She joined the Egyptian army, which proclaimed her queen and her role encouraged more vigorous fighting from the Egyptians.

Seeing as reinforcements had yet to arrive for Caesar, he looked for methods to "win the peoples friendship." To do this, Caesar made Ptolemy appear in front of and speak to the people of Alexandria to show he was unharmed and desired peace. The Egyptians realized, similar to when Caesar sent the messengers, that Caesar was behind this display and were not swayed to cease fighting.

When a dispute arose within Arsinoe's followers, she was urged by Ganymede to call upon the execution of Achillas suggesting he would betray them. The two then successfully arranged his murder, and upon his death, Ganymede assumed command of the army.

Early on during the siege Pothinus, one of Ptolemy's advisors, had gone secretly to Achillas to become his associate. Shortly after Achillas was put to death, one of Caesar's slaves discovered communications between Pothinus and the besiegers. Caesar became fearful that he would kidnap Ptolemy and had Pothınós executed.

Sometime during the siege, Caesar noticed that the water being drawn from his supplies looked "a little more brackish than usual," and had a sweet taste When Caesars soldiers became alarmed at the state of the water, Caesar tried to put their discomfort to rest by suggesting that water sourced by seashores "naturally possessed veins of sweet water." The water had been contaminated by Ganymede who used seawater to make Caesars drinking supply become undrinkable. The contamination ultimately forced his men to have to dig new wells.

Reinforcements then arrived from his Thirty-seventh legion, a former Pompeian formation, arriving by sea bringing supplies and artillery.

=== Naval battle ===
Map of the City of Alexandria c. 30 depicting the great harbor and Pharos Island.

Naval battle was paramount during the siege. Access to harbor exits was crucial as those points were where Caesar could access aid and if they were cut off, it would make receiving reinforcements difficult to manage.

In the beginning, both the Egyptian army and Caesars fleets were swiftly thrown together. The Egyptian army initially repurposed boats that had originally served to police the Nile as well as warships that were taken from old royal shipyards to form their navy.

When Caesar set fire to the Alexandrian fleet, Ganymedes ordered the Alexandrians to repair as many ships as possible. They readied 27 warships for battle. Caesar unwilling to give up his naval superiority drew up his own fleet, 19 warships and 15 smaller vessels, in two lines just north of the coast of Pharos Island. Ganymedes sailed out from the Eunostos Harbor and formed two lines opposite Caesar's fleet. Between the two fleets were shoals, a narrow channel being the only way through. Both sides eventually held their position, neither wanting to make the initial move.

Euphranor, the commander of Caesar's Rhodian allies, convinced Caesar that he and his men could push through and hold for long enough to let the rest of the fleet pass through the channel. Four Rhodian ships sailed through the channel and formed a line against the Alexandrian ships rapidly closing in, delaying them long enough for the rest of Caesar's fleet to pass through. With the channel to his back Caesar needed to win because retreat would be disastrous. Though the Alexandrians were excellent sailors the Romans had a deciding advantage: because of the proximity of the coast and the shoals there was little room for maneuver. The ships were forced into close combat, something the Romans excelled at. Two Alexandrian ships were captured, three more were sunk, and the rest fled back to the Eunostos.

=== Battle for Pharos ===
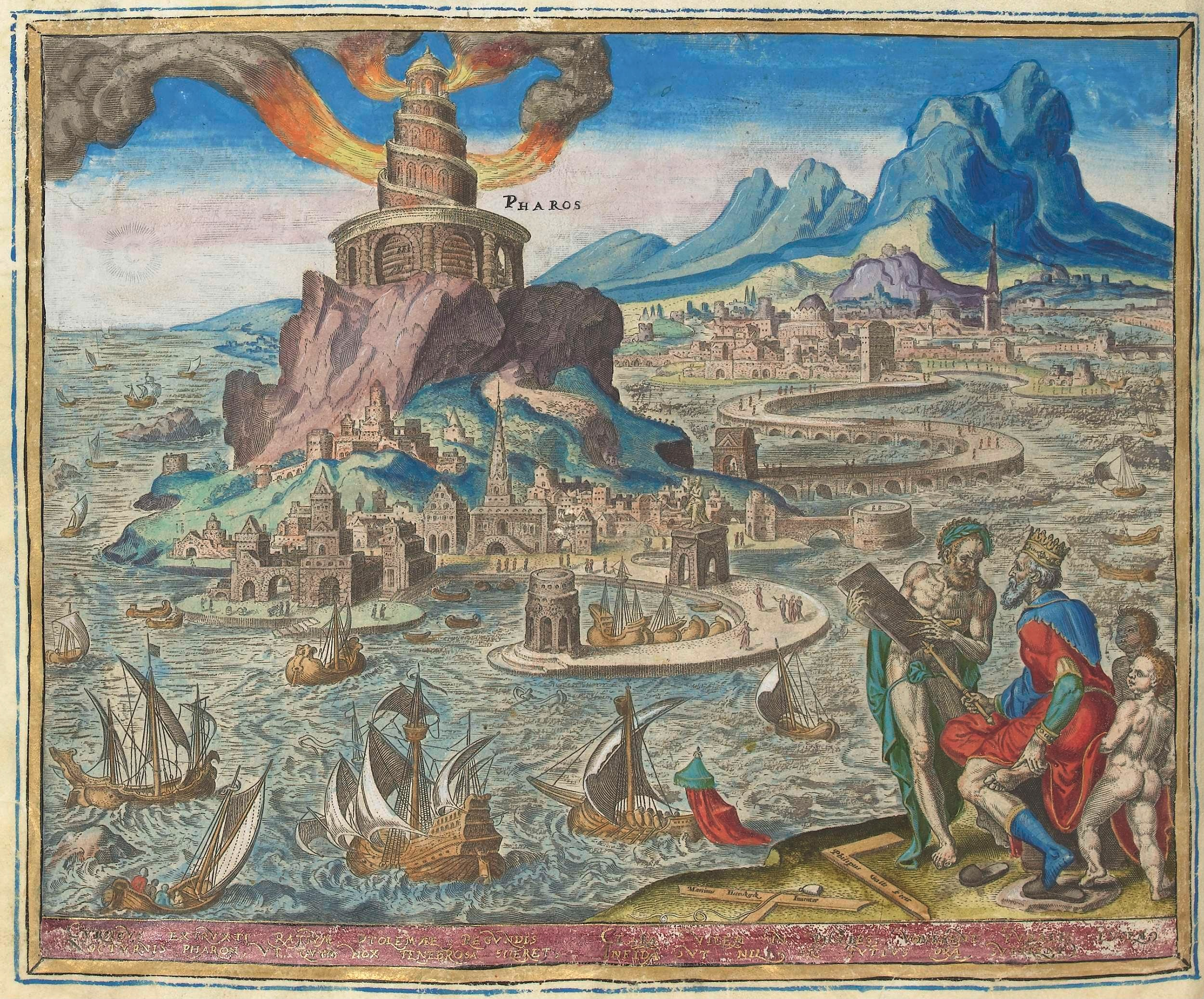
Lighthouse of Alexandria by Philip Galle (1537-1612). Depiction of the Lighthouse of Alexandria on the Island of Pharos.

After winning the battle for naval supremacy Caesar turned his attention to Pharos Island where the Lighthouse of Alexandria was situated. The island was crucial for controlling access into the harbors and was linked to the mainland through a bridge, the Heptastadium, connected by two moles, one from the island and one from the mainland. Caesar had stationed a small garrison on the northeastern part of the island opposite the Lighthouse of Alexandria. He ordered ten cohorts of legionaries, some light infantry and his Gallic cavalry to board their transports and led them on an amphibious assault of the island while his garrison on the island attacked the Alexandrians simultaneously.

After a hard-fought battle the Alexandrians retreated from the island. Caesar fortified defenses around the bridge controlling access to the Pharos, the Alexandrians doing the same on the mainland. The bridge had a large arch through which the Alexandrians could send ships to attack Caesar's transports. To stop the Alexandrians from doing this Caesar needed to take control of the bridge. The day after taking the island he sent several ships with archers and artillery to clear the bridge and he then landed with three cohorts on the bridge. He ordered his men to start constructing a rampart on the bridge while men from the Pharos brought up stones to block the arch. The Alexandrians suddenly launched a two-pronged counterattack by land and sea to take the bridge back. Caesar's captains decided to take the initiative themselves by landing archers and slingers on the bridge to fend off the enemy ships. The Alexandrians, however, landed their troops behind them and attacked them from the rear. Caesar's light troops were quickly outfought by the heavily armed Alexandrian soldiers. Caesar was now caught in a pincer and ordered his troops to withdraw to their transports.

In the panic, Caesar's craft was swamped by soldiers, forcing him to remove his armor and then swim to shore, holding his left hand above water to save some important documents. The battle ended in defeat; although Pharos Island was still in Caesar's hands, the bridge was not. He had lost some eight hundred men (about half legionnaires and half sailors) but morale remained high and Caesar's men continued to repulse enemy attacks.

=== Arrival of relief army ===
Soon after the skirmish for Pharos, a deputation from the Alexandrians asked Caesar to exchange Arsinoe for Ptolemy XIII, claiming a general weariness with the despotic rule of Arsinoe and Ganymede. Ptolemy XIII, feigning fear of being sent away, was released; he promptly joined his sister and urged his soldiers to continue the attack on Caesar. Contemporaries viewed this in satirical terms, saying "Caesar's excessive kindness was made absurd by the deceit of a boy".

Renewed assaults on Roman positions were unsuccessful. The situation began to turn in Caesar's favour when news reached him in March 47 BC of a relief army under the command of Mithridates of Pergamum arriving overland from Syria. It was a force of allies rather than Romans, including detachments sent by Iamblichus I of Emesa, Ptolemy of Iturea and Chalcis, and 3,000 Jews contributed by High Priest Hyrcanus II and led by Antipater the Idumaean. The Jewish detachment encouraged the Jewish population of Alexandria to become more sympathetic to Caesar and after Mithridates' forces stormed Pelusium, Ptolemy XIII's forces redeployed east to contest Mithridates' crossing of the Nile.

== Aftermath ==
During a rushed attempt to flee from Caesar's forces, the Alexandrians pitched themselves to the sea. This action killed many of the fleeing men including Ganymede. King Ptolemy was taken aboard a ship to flee as well, however amidst the chaos, the ship capsized and Ptolemy drowned, being only around the age of 15. Ptolemy's crown was passed to his younger brother Ptolemy XIV and Cleopatra to serve as co-rulers.

While Pothinus and Achillas were executed during the siege, Theodotus of Chios, (Ptolemy's last remaining advisor) fled Egypt and escaped. He was later found in Asia by Marcus Brutus and tortured to death. Arsinoe was marched through Rome as a prisoner, banished to the Temple of Artemis in Ephesus, and later, (after the death of Caesar,) executed on the orders of Cleopatra and Mark Antony.

Caesar toured Egypt for two months with Cleopatra before renewing his activities in the civil war. During his remaining time in Egypt after the tour, Caesar began the works for a building plan for the city of Alexandria. This plan would include a structure to honor Caesar and his family. This building plan was passed on to Cleopatra after Caesar returned to Rome.

== Sources ==
- Beard, Mary (2015). SPQR: a history of ancient Rome (1st ed.). New York. ISBN 978-0-87140-423-7. OCLC 902661394.
- Bevan, E. R. (1927). A history of Egypt under the Ptolemaic dynasty, by Edwyn Bevan. Methuen
- Caesar, J., & Hirtius, A. (1955). Alexandrian, African and Spanish wars (A. G. Way, Tran.). Harvard University Press. ISBN 0674994434
- Caesar, J., Peskett, A. G. (Arthur G., & Caesar, J. (1928). Caesar : the civil wars. William Heinemann.
- Cassius Dio Cocceianus. (1914). Dio’s Roman history (E. Cary & H. B. Foster, Trans.). W. Heinemann.
- Florus, L. A., Nepos, C., Forster, E. S. (Edward S., & Rolfe, J. C. (1929). Epitome of Roman history. William Heinemann Ltd.
- Goldsworthy, Adrian (2006). Caesar: Life of a Colossus. Yale University Press. ISBN 978-0-300-13919-8.
- Rawson, Elizabeth (1992). "Caesar: Civil War and Dictatorship". Cambridge Ancient History. Vol. 9. ISBN 0-521-25603-8.
- Roller, D. W. (2010). Cleopatra : a biography. Oxford University Press.
- Johnson, Adam (2022). I Came, I Saw, I Dallied: Julius Caesar’s Expedition to Egypt, 48–47 BCE. Animus The University of Chicagos Undergraduate Journal for the Classics
- Tempest, Kathryn (2017). Brutus: the noble conspirator. New Haven. ISBN 978-0-300-18009-1. OCLC 982651923.
- Tyldesley, J. (2008). Cleopatra : Last Queen of Egypt. Basic Books.
- Plutarch (1919) [2nd century AD]. "Life of Caesar". Parallel Lives. Loeb Classical Library. Vol. 7. Translated by Perrin, Bernadotte. Harvard University Press
- Plutarch (1917) [2nd century AD]. "Life of Pompey". Parallel Lives. Loeb Classical Library. Vol. 5. Translated by Perrin, Bernadotte. Harvard University Press.
- Polyzoides, A. J. (2022). Alexandria : City of gifts and sorrows from hellenistic civilization to multiethnic metropolis. Liverpool University Press. ISBN 9781782841562
