= Theodotus of Chios =

Rhetoric tutor of Ptolemy XIII of Egypt (died 43/42 BC)

Theodotus of Chios (Greek: Θεόδοτος) (died in 43 or 42 BC) was the rhetoric tutor of the young Egyptian king Ptolemy XIII.

== Biography ==
Theodotus of Chios was a trained rhetorician and the tutor of Ptolemy XIII. He was one of the three influential men who led the guardianship for the young Egyptian king after the death of Ptolemy XII (spring of 51 BC). The most powerful of these men was the eunuch and minister Pothinus, the second in rank was the commander-in-chief Achillas and finally in third place was Theodotus. In the autumn of 50, these three guardians succeeded in securing Ptolemy XIII the participation in the rule of Egypt together with his ambitious older sister Cleopatra VII who in the first year of her accession to the throne (spring of 51) had been able to rule alone. At the end of 49, Pothinus and his comrades expelled the Queen from Egypt. Ptolemy XIII became the sole ruler but was still under the influence of his three guardians.

The dethroned queen soon organized her own army by recruiting mercenaries in Palestine. Ptolemy XIII and his advisers were forced to move with their army into position near the Egyptian border fortress Pelusium, not far from the troops of Cleopatra. At that time, at the end of July 48 BC, the Roman triumvir Pompey – who had lost the Battle of Pharsalus against Julius Caesar – appeared at the Egyptian coast near Pelusium and asked the allied Pharaoh for asylum and assistance.

The advisers of Ptolemy XIII officially agreed to the petition of Pompey to gain time. After the departure of the Roman messengers a council of state was held to discuss the next steps. Caesar in his Commentarii de Bello Civili and the Roman poet Lucan in his Pharsalia do not mention the participation of Theodotus in this council, but other sources say his suggestion to murder Pompey was accepted. With professional skillfulness, Theodotus justified his plan: if Pompey was received, he would become the ruler of Egypt making Caesar the enemy of the country; if Pompey was rejected, he would be discontented with the refusal and Caesar would also be dissatisfied because he had to continue his pursuit. The best course was therefore to kill Pompey. Caesar would then be satisfied and the murdered Roman general would no longer be a danger. The assassination of Pompey was executed by Lucius Septimius at the behest of Achillas.

Only two days later, Caesar arrived with a fleet in Alexandria. According to the Roman historian Livy and the Greek biographer Plutarch, it was Theodotus who delivered the signet ring and the head of Pompey to Caesar. But the Roman general was allegedly disgusted and wept. Ancient and modern historians have different opinions if the tears of Caesar were honest. Caesar stayed in Egypt and tried to win influence in political affairs by claiming to decide the Ptolemaic struggle for the throne. He also demanded the payment of a large sum of money that the Ptolemaic government allegedly owed him for the military restoration of Ptolemy XII in 55 BC. This behaviour caused a war between the Roman dictator and the supporters of Ptolemy XIII. Because Caesar’s army was much too small he could only win the war after long and hard fighting.

Pothinus and Achillas were assassinated during the war, but Theodotus escaped from Egypt and for some years eked out a miserable existence. He died in Asia in 43 or 42 BC when Marcus Junius Brutus or Gaius Cassius Longinus put him cruelly to death. The Roman rhetorician Quintilian tells that a discussion with Caesar about the punishment of Theodotus was a subject in schools of rhetoric.

== In media ==
- Theodotus is one of the characters in George Bernard Shaw's Caesar and Cleopatra. He was played by Ernest Thesiger in the 1946 film adaptation.
- Theodotus is played by Herbert Berghof in Joseph L. Mankiewicz's epic long 1963 film adaptation of Cleopatra.
- In the 1983 TV mini-series The Cleopatras, Theodotus is portrayed by Graham Crowden.
- Theodotus plays a major role in the Last Pharaoh series by Jay Penner
- In the episode "Caesarion" of the television series Rome (2005–07) Theodotus is portrayed by actor David de Keyser. He is decapitated by the Romans and his head is placed on a spike on the outer wall of the pharaoh's palace.
- See also C.P. Cavafy's poem "Theodotus."
