= Arsinoe IV =

Queen of Ptolemaic Egypt from 48 BC to 47 BC

Arsinoë IV
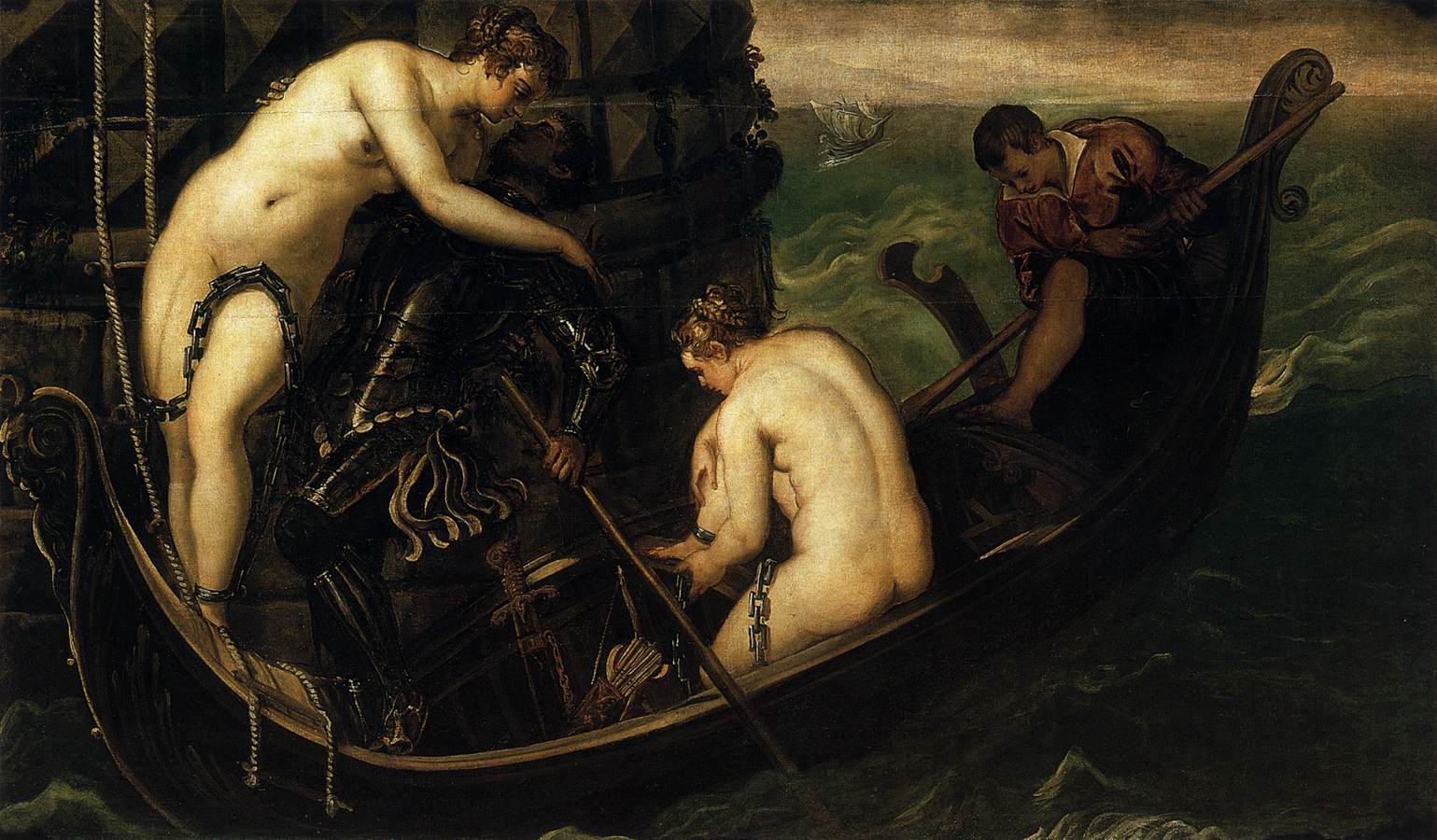
- The Deliverance of Arsinoe, by Jacopo Tintoretto (1555–1556)

Pharaoh and Queen of the Ptolemaic Kingdom (disputed)
- Reign: September 48 BC with Ptolemy XIII (December 48 – January 47 BC)
- Predecessor: Ptolemy XIII and Cleopatra VII
- Successor: Ptolemy XIV and Cleopatra VII
- Father: Ptolemy XII Auletes
- Mother: Unknown
- Born: 68–63 BC; Alexandria, Egypt
- Died: 41 BC; Ephesus (modern-day Selçuk, İzmir, Turkey)
- Burial: Ephesus
- Dynasty: Ptolemaic dynasty

Arsinoë IV (Ancient Greek: Ἀρσινόη; between 68 and 63 BC – 41 BC) was the youngest daughter of Ptolemy XII Auletes. One of the last members of the Ptolemaic dynasty, she claimed title of Queen of Ptolemaic Egypt and co-rulership with her brother Ptolemy XIII in 48 BC – 47 BC in opposition to her sister or half-sister, Cleopatra VII. For her role in conducting the siege of Alexandria (47 BC) against Cleopatra, Arsinoë was taken as a prisoner of war to Rome by the Roman triumvir Julius Caesar following the defeat of Ptolemy XIII in the Battle of the Nile. Arsinoë was then exiled to the Temple of Artemis at Ephesus in Roman Anatolia, but she was executed there by orders of triumvir Mark Antony in 41 BC at the behest of his lover Cleopatra VII.

== History ==
Arsinoë was the third, possibly fourth daughter of Ptolemy XII by an unknown woman (Cleopatra VII's probable mother Cleopatra V had died or been repudiated not long after Cleopatra VII was born, hence it's unclear if she bore her husband's younger children.) When Ptolemy XII died in 51 BC, he left his eldest son and eldest surviving daughter, Ptolemy and Cleopatra, as joint rulers of Egypt, but Ptolemy soon dethroned Cleopatra and forced her to flee from Alexandria. Julius Caesar arrived in Alexandria in 48 BC pursuing his rival, Pompey, whom he had defeated at the Battle of Pharsalus. When he arrived in Alexandria, he was presented with Pompey's head. The execution of his long-term rival ended the possibility of an alliance between Caesar and Ptolemy, and he sided with Cleopatra's faction. He declared that in accordance with Ptolemy XII's will, Cleopatra and Ptolemy would rule Egypt jointly, and in a similar motion restored Cyprus, which had been annexed by Rome in 58 BC, to Egypt's rule and gave it to Arsinoë and her youngest brother, Ptolemy XIV.

However, Arsinoë then escaped from the capital with her mentor, the eunuch Ganymedes, and took command of the Egyptian army. She also proclaimed herself Queen as Arsinoë IV, executed Achillas, whom she had replaced as the army commander, and placed Ganymedes second in command of the army immediately below herself. Under Arsinoë's leadership, the Egyptians enjoyed some success against the Romans. The Egyptians trapped Caesar in a section of the city by building walls to close off the streets. Caesar countered this measure by digging wells into the porous limestone beneath the city that contained fresh water. This only partially alleviated the situation, so he then sent ships out along the coast to search for more fresh water there. Caesar realized that he would need to break out of the city and hoped to do so by gaining control of the harbor. He launched an attack to seize control of the Lighthouse of Alexandria but Arsinoë's forces drove him back. Recognizing his imminent defeat, Caesar removed his armor and purple cloak so that he could swim to the safety of a nearby Roman ship.

The leading Egyptian officers, having become disappointed with Ganymedes, and under a pretext of wanting peace, negotiated with Caesar to exchange Arsinoë for Ptolemy XIII. After Ptolemy was released he continued the war until the Romans received reinforcements and inflicted a decisive defeat upon the Egyptians. Arsinoë, now in Roman captivity, was transported to Rome, where in 46 BC she was forced to appear in Caesar's triumph and was paraded behind a burning effigy of the Lighthouse of Alexandria, which had been the scene of her victory over him. Arsinoe, along with Juba II, elicited sympathy from the crowd. Despite the custom of strangling prominent prisoners in triumphs when the festivities concluded, Caesar was pressured to spare Arsinoë and granted her sanctuary at the temple of Artemis in Ephesus. Arsinoë lived in the temple for a few years, always keeping a watchful eye on her sister Cleopatra, who perceived Arsinoë as a threat to her power. In 41 BC, at Cleopatra's instigation, Mark Antony ordered Arsinoë's execution on the steps of the temple. Her murder was a gross violation of the temple sanctuary and an act that scandalised Rome. The eunuch priest (Megabyzos) who had welcomed Arsinoë on her arrival at the temple as "queen" was only pardoned when an embassy from Ephesus made a petition to Cleopatra.

== Year of birth ==
Arsinoë's year of birth is generally regarded as being between 68 and 63 BC: The Encyclopædia Britannica cites 63 BC, making her 15 at the time of her uprising and defeat against Julius Caesar and 22 at her death, while the researcher Alissa Lyon cites 68 BC making her 27 at her death. Joyce Tyldesley places her birth date as between 68 and 65 BC. An alternate hypothesis was in the docudrama "Cleopatra: Portrait of a Killer", in which it was alleged a headless skeleton of a female child between the ages of 15 and 18 may be Arsinoë.

Her actions in the brief war against Caesar naturally suggest that she was older than that and thus, would make it impossible for her to be the headless female child buried in the tomb. Perhaps the strongest evidence that she was in fact exercising her own authority is that Caesar, after the Pharos debacle, was prepared to release Ptolemy XIII—a male, who continued the war against Caesar—just to get his hands on her. Stacy Schiff, who places Arsinoë's age at around seventeen during the events of 48-47 BC, notes that Arsinoë "burned with ambition" and was "not the kind of girl who inspired complacency," writing that once Arsinoë escaped the royal palace she became more vocal against her half-sister and that she assumed her position as head of the army alongside anti-Caesar courtier Achillas.

== Tomb at Ephesus ==
In the 1990s the octagonal monument that had housed the remains was hypothesized by Hilke Thür of the Austrian Academy of Sciences to be the tomb of Arsinoë IV. Thür had re-entered the tomb at Ephesus in 1993 and examined the post-cranial remains that had been left inside the burial chamber. Her hypothesis regarding the skeletal remains was based on the shape of the tomb, which was octagonal like the second tier of the Lighthouse of Alexandria, the radiocarbon dating of the bones (between 200 and 20 BC), the individual's sex, and the age at their death.

A DNA test of the post-cranial skeleton was also attempted to determine the identity of the young individual. However, it was impossible to get an accurate reading since the bones had been handled too many times. The skull was not available for analysis at the time as it was thought to have been lost decades prior. Thür alleged that the skeleton displayed signs of African ancestry mixed with classical Grecian features – however Boas, Gravlee, Bernard and Leonard, and others have demonstrated that skull measurements are not a reliable indicator of race, and the measurements were jotted down in 1920 before modern forensic science took hold. Arsinoë and Cleopatra shared the same father (Ptolemy XII Auletes) but may have had different mothers, with Thür claiming the alleged African ancestry came from the individual's mother.

In 2009 Kanz, Großschmidt & Kiesslich presented a morphological analysis of the post-cranial skeleton and a soft tissue reconstruction of the head performed by forensic anthropologists Caroline Wilkinson and Christopher Rynn to show what the individual may have looked like. The reconstructions were done with images and measurements from Weninger's 1953 publication only, as the scientist still did not have access to the skull itself seeing as it was long presumed lost. Age was estimated to be between 15 and 17 years and sex was concluded as female on examination of the post-cranial skeleton and interpretation of Weninger's notes on the skull. DNA analyses were carried out but did not yield conclusive results.

English classicist Mary Beard criticized Thür's conclusions as well as the belief that the Ephesus skeleton belonged to Arsinoë, originally Thür's idea that had been revived by Kanz and colleagues. In an online essay she pointed out that the tomb lacked any surviving inscription of name and the skull upon which conclusions were partly founded had not even been available to Thür or Kanz. Furthermore, she suggested that the individual's age at the time of death as estimated by Kanz from the post-cranial remains might be too young for them to have belonged to Arsinoë as she is thought to have been in her mid-twenties when she died.

In 2022 Ernst Rudolf and Peter Scherrer, archaeologists of the University of Graz were researching for their book on the tomb of Ephesus and contacted the Department of Evolutionary Anthropology, University of Vienna to request permission to photograph the skull for inclusion in their forthcoming publication. This occasion inspired the re-examination of the skull after it had remained untouched for almost 70 years.

In 2025 the study led by anthropologists of the Department of Evolutionary Anthropology, University of Vienna, revealed new findings about the skull. The DNA analyses from the cranium as well as the femur (the rib fragment was insufficient) were able to demonstrate that the Ephesus skeletal remains did in fact not belong to Arsinoë IV but to a male individual.

== Bibliography ==
- "Arsinoe IV". Encyclopedia Britannica. 12 November 2019.
- Chisholm, Hugh, ed. (1911). "Arsinoë" . Encyclopædia Britannica. Vol. 2 (11th ed.). Cambridge University Press. p. 655.
- Draycott, Jane (2022). Cleopatra's Daughter: Egyptian Princess, Roman Prisoner, African Queen. Head of Zeus. ISBN 978-1-324-09259-9.
- Keil, Josef; Reisch, Emil (1930). Ephesos: Ein Führer durch d. Ruinenstätte u. ihre Geschichte (in German) (2nd ed.). Vienna: Dr. B. Filser.
- Kleiner, Diana E. E.; Buxton, Bridget (2008). "Pledges of Empire: The Ara Pacis and the Donations of Rome". American Journal of Archaeology. 112 (1): 57–89. doi:10.3764/aja.112.1.57. ISSN 0002-9114. JSTOR 40037244. S2CID 155502681.
- Kleiner, Diana E. E. (30 June 2009). Cleopatra and Rome. Harvard University Press. ISBN 978-0-674-03966-7.
- Mahaffy, J. P. (1899). "Chapter X". A History Of Egypt. Vol. IV. New York City: Charles Scribner's Sons. pp. 143, 147.
- Wilcken, Ulrich (1895). "Arsinoë 28" . In Wissowa, Georg (ed.). Realencyclopädie der classischen Altertumswissenschaft (in German). Vol. II, 1. J.B. Metzler. pp. 1288–1289.

Arsinoe IV Ptolemaic dynasty Born: 68–63 BC Died: 41 BC
Regnal titles
| Preceded by Ptolemy XIII; Cleopatra VII | Pharaoh of Egypt (claimant); 48–47 BC with Ptolemy XIII | Succeeded by Cleopatra VII; Ptolemy XIV |
