= Battle of the Nile (47 BC) =

Battle of the Alexandrian War

Coordinates: 30°54′N 31°7′E

First Battle of the Nile
- Part of the Alexandrian war and Caesar's Civil War
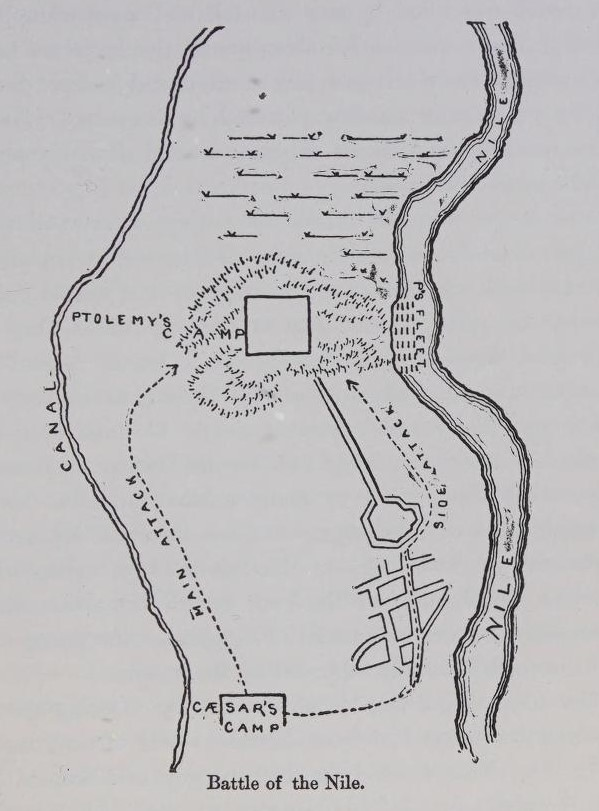
- Map of the battle
Date	early 47 BC
Location	Nile Delta, Egypt
Result	Roman victory; Cleopatra and Ptolemy XIV installed as co-rulers of Egypt

Belligerents
Roman Republic (pro-Caesar forces); Ptolemaic Kingdom (pro-Cleopatra forces) Greek forces of Mithridates Kingdom of Judea	Ptolemaic Kingdom

Commanders and leaders
Julius Caesar; Cleopatra VII; Mithridates of Pergamum; Antipater the Idumean	Ptolemy XIII †; Arsinoe IV (POW); Ganymedes †

Strength
c. 20,000 infantry c. 1,000 cavalry	c. 27,000 infantry c. 2,000 cavalry

The Battle of the Nile in early 47 BC saw the combined Roman–Egyptian armies of Julius Caesar and Cleopatra VII defeat those of the rival Queen Arsinoe IV and King Ptolemy XIII and secure the throne of Egypt.

== Prelude ==
After pursuing his rival Pompey to Egypt, Caesar, recently victorious in a civil war closer to home, became entwined in the Alexandrine civil war after his rival, Pompey Magnus, was killed by King Ptolemy XIII in an attempt to please Caesar.

From September 48 BC until January 47 BC, Caesar was besieged in Alexandria, Egypt with about 4,000 men. He was attempting to resolve the Egyptian Civil War between Ptolemy XIII and his sister Cleopatra. When Caesar began to appear to favour Cleopatra over him, Ptolemy was first captured, but then released by Caesar, and gathered his army to besiege the Romans in a small area of Alexandria.

By January, the Egyptians had begun to get the upper hand in their efforts to cut the Romans off from reinforcements and resupply. Caesar had requested reinforcements from his allies who gathered an army of about 13,000 troops trained in the Roman style of warfare under Mithridates of Pergamum, who marched overland from Asia Minor to assist him. Arriving in Egypt in January, Mithridates stormed and took the strategic city of Pelusium and marched on towards the Nile Delta where he defeated an Egyptian force sent to stop him. A Jewish force, led by Antipater, also joined them. Caesar, getting a message that his allies were close, left a small garrison in Alexandria and hurried to meet them. The combined force, about 20,000 strong, met the Egyptians in February 47 BC at the Battle of the Nile. The Ptolemaic army, equipped in the Greek manner, was slightly larger.

== Battle ==
The Egyptians had set up camp in a strong position along the Nile, and were accompanied by a fleet. Caesar arrived shortly afterwards, before Ptolemy could attack Mithridates' army. Caesar and Mithridates met 7 miles from Ptolemy's position. In order to reach the Egyptian camp they had to ford a small river. Ptolemy sent a detachment of cavalry and light infantry to stop them from crossing the river. Unfortunately for the Egyptians, Caesar had sent his Gallic and Germanic cavalry to ford the river ahead of the main army. They had crossed undetected. When Caesar arrived he had his men make makeshift bridges across the river and had his army charge the Egyptians. As they did the Gallic and Germanic forces appeared and charged into the Egyptian flank and rear. The Egyptians broke and fled back to Ptolemy's camp, with many fleeing by boat. As Ptolemy tried to flee, he drowned in the river Nile through debated circumstances.

== Aftermath ==
Egypt was now in the hands of Caesar, who then lifted the Second Siege of Alexandria and placed Cleopatra on the throne as co-ruler with another of her brothers, the twelve-year old Ptolemy XIV. Caesar then uncharacteristically lingered in Egypt until April, enjoying a liaison of about two months with the youthful queen before departing to resume his civil war. Around this time, she became pregnant with Caesarion. The former queen Arsinoe IV was marched through Rome as a prisoner and banished to the Temple of Artemis in Ephesus. Later, after the death of Caesar, she was executed on the orders of Cleopatra and Mark Antony.

== Sources ==
- Brice, Lee L. (2014). Warfare in the Roman Republic: From the Etruscan Wars to the Battle of Actium. Santa Barbara: ABC-CLIO. ISBN 9781610692991.
- Cary, M. & H. H. Scullard (1980) [1976]. A History of Rome. London: MacMillan. ISBN 0-312-38395-9.
- Fischer-Bovet, Christelle (2014). Army and Society in Ptolemaic Egypt. Cambridge University Press. ISBN 9781107007758.
- Grainger, John D. (2013). Egypt and Judaea. Pen and Sword. ISBN 9781848848238.
- Smith, William (1867). "Achillas". Dictionary of Greek and Roman Biography and Mythology. Tomo I. Boston: Brown.
- Sorokin, Pitirim Aleksandrovich (1962). Social and Cultural Dynamics: FLuctuation of social relationships, war, and revolution. New York: Bedminster Press.
- Tucker, Spencer C. (2009). A Global Chronology of Conflict: From the Ancient World to the Modern Middle East. Santa Barbara: ABC-CLIO. ISBN 9781851096725.
- Yalichev, Serge (1997). Mercenaries of the ancient world. Hippocrene Books. ISBN 9780781806749.
