= Pothinus =

Egyptian eunuch and regent (died 48 or 47 BC)

- Born: c. 90 BC
- Died: 48 or 47 BC (aged c. 43); Alexandria, Egypt

Pothinus or Potheinos (Ancient Greek: Ποθεινός; early 1st century BC – 48 or 47 BC), a eunuch, was regent for Pharaoh Ptolemy XIII Theos Philopator of the Ptolemaic Kingdom. He is most remembered for turning Ptolemy against his sister and co-ruler Cleopatra, thus starting a civil war, and for having Pompey decapitated and presenting the severed head to Julius Caesar according to some sources.

When Ptolemy XII died in 51 BC, his will stated that Ptolemy XIII and Cleopatra VII were to become co-rulers of Egypt, with the Roman Republic as their guardians. Ptolemy XIII was underage and Pothinus was appointed as his regent. The general Achillas and the rhetorician Theodotus of Chios were also guardians of the Egyptian king. When Ptolemy and Cleopatra were elevated to the status of senior rulers, Pothinus was maintained as the former's regent. Most Egyptologists believed that Pothinus used his influence to turn Ptolemy against Cleopatra. In the spring of 48 BC, Ptolemy, under Pothinus' guidance, attempted to depose Cleopatra in order to become sole ruler while Pothinus planned to act as the power behind the throne. They gained control of Alexandria, then the capital of Egypt, and forced Cleopatra out of the city. She soon organized her own army and a civil war began in Egypt, while Arsinoe IV also began to claim the throne for herself.

Rome was also enveloped in civil war, and after his defeat in the Battle of Pharsalus, Pompey sought asylum in Egypt. Initially, Pothinus pretended to have accepted his request, but on 29 September 48 BC, Pothinus had the general murdered, hoping to win favor with Julius Caesar, who had defeated Pompey. When Caesar arrived, he was presented with the head of Pompey, but he responded with grief and disgust and ordered that Pompey's body be located and given a proper Roman funeral. Pothinus had neglected to note that Caesar had been granting clemency to his enemies, including Cassius, Cicero, and Brutus. Cleopatra used Pothinus's mistake to gain favor with Caesar and eventually became his lover.

Caesar then arranged for the execution of Pothinus and the marriage of Cleopatra to Ptolemy. In the last chapter of Commentaries on the Civil War, however, it is described that Pothinus arranged for Achillas to attack Alexandria and upon sending a message not to hesitate but to fulfill the plan, the messengers were exposed, whereupon Caesar had Pothinus imprisoned and killed, probably with a knife. His death occurred during the ten-month Siege of Alexandria.

== Depictions ==
Only Roman and Greek sources have mentioned Pothinus. He is thus criticized for his murder of Pompey and his insidious behavior with regard to Caesar, while both measures are generally believed to have served to keep Egypt out of Caesar's Civil War. As it happened, however, Caesar came to emerge as the sole credible contender for his position of power, with Pompey dead and a Roman protectorate installed in Egypt.

Pothinus's brief role and death have been depicted more fancifully in dramatic literature.

- In George Bernard Shaw's play Caesar and Cleopatra, Cleopatra arranges to have him secretly murdered by her female servant Ftatateeta after he embarrasses her (Cleopatra) in front of Caesar by telling him that she longs for his departure from Egypt so that she can rule alone. He is killed offstage. In the 1945 film based on this play, Caesar and Cleopatra, he was portrayed by Francis L. Sullivan, and in a 1976 television version of the play, he was portrayed by Noel Willman.
- In Cecil B. DeMille's 1934 film Cleopatra, in which he was portrayed by Leonard Mudie, Cleopatra kills him herself, after realizing that he is hiding behind a curtain, ready to murder Caesar.
- In the 1963 film Cleopatra, starring Elizabeth Taylor, he was portrayed by Grégoire Aslan. Pothinus tries to poison Cleopatra, but the plot is discovered in time, whereupon he is put on trial (with no witnesses testifying), pronounced guilty, and sentenced to death by Caesar. Cleopatra's faithful male servant Apollodorus follows Pothinus and the small procession of guards as they exit the room, and within a few seconds an off-screen death scream is heard. One of the returning guards approaches Caesar and gives him a dagger. Caesar then summons his servant Flavius and hands him the dagger with the words, "Please return this to Apollodorus. You might clean it first; it has Pothinus all over it."
- In the 1970 filme Cleopatra (1970), he is portrayed a large, bearded dark-skinned manned who is in a homosexual relationship with Ptolemy.
- Pothinus is depicted, portrayed by David Foxxe, in the 2002 TV miniseries Julius Caesar, as he pretends to welcome Pompey but rather silently orders for him to be assassinated by his own guards, and later welcomes Caesar, in the famous gift scene. He is later mentioned by Cleopatra while explaining the Civil War to Caesar.
- In "Caesarion", an episode of the television series Rome (2005–07), Pothinus is portrayed by actor Tony Guilfoyle; he is beheaded by the Romans and his head is placed on a spike on the outer wall of the palace.
- In The Judgment of Caesar (part of the Roma Sub Rosa series by Steven Saylor) he is forced to drink poisoned wine by Caesar.
- Pothinus is an antagonist in Assassin's Creed Origins, where he is depicted as a member (nicknamed "The Scorpion") of the Order of the Ancients, a precursor organization to the Templar Order. In the game, he is assassinated by the protagonist Bayek during the Battle of the Nile.
