= Lucius Septimius =

Roman soldier and assassin of Pompey the Great

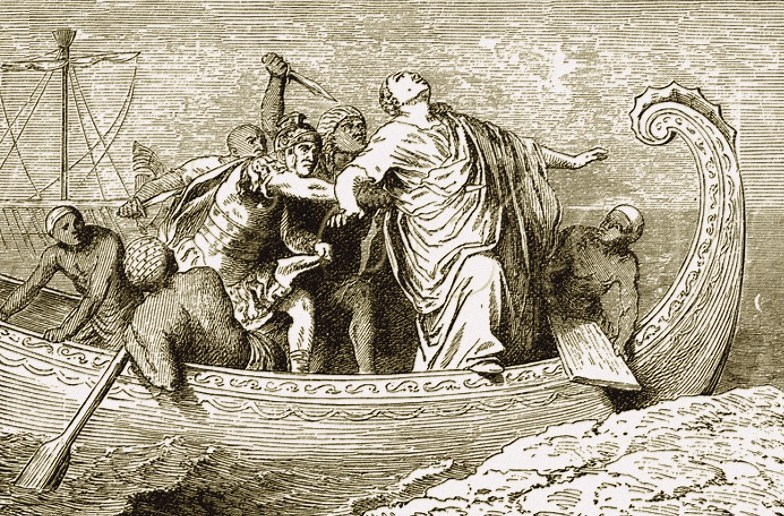
Septimius (in armour) strikes Pompey from behind. 1880 illustration

Lucius Septimius was a Roman soldier and mercenary who is principally remembered as one of the assassins of the triumvir Pompey the Great. At the time of the assassination in 48 BC, Septimius was serving the Ptolemies of Egypt as a mercenary. He was dispatched with orders to murder Pompey by Ptolemy XIII's advisors who wanted to win the favour of Julius Caesar for their king.

== Life ==
Septimius had served under Pompey in his eastern campaign in the 60s BC, and he was in the army with which Aulus Gabinius restored Cleopatra's father Ptolemy XII Auletes to the throne in 55 BC. He had stayed in Egypt as part of a mercenary garrison, known as the Gabiniani, to support the king. In Commentarii de Bello Civili, Caesar refers to him as a "military tribune".

Septimius was a leading figure among the Gabiniani. When Pompey fled to Egypt in 48 BC following his defeat by Julius Caesar at the Battle of Pharsalus, Pompey hoped to gain their support along with that of the new Egyptian king Ptolemy XIII, having been friends with Egypt's prior king, Ptolemy XII Auletes; however the advisers of the child successor believed they could win Caesar's favor by killing his foe. The Egyptian general Achillas met Pompey at the shore in Alexandria accompanied by Septimius and a centurion named Salvius. They greeted him under a pretense of friendship and killed him upon landing.

According to both Plutarch and Caesar's account, Pompey was reassured by the presence of Septimius, whom he knew from earlier campaigns. But it was Septimius who led the attack by stabbing Pompey in the back, then Salvius and Achillas joined in. Septimius then beheaded the corpse and removed Pompey's signet ring. The killing did not placate Caesar and in the ensuing war, the Gabiniani sided with Cleopatra's brother Ptolemy XIII, against Caesar and Cleopatra. Septimius's ultimate fate went unrecorded.

== In literature ==
Later literary accounts often attributed Pompey's murder solely to Septimius, or place the principal guilt on him. This is the case in the poem Pharsalia by the Roman poet Lucan, in which the fact that Septimius, a Roman, was doing the bidding of a foreign king is depicted as especially shameful. Lucan portrays Septimius as the archetype of a traitor: "With what reputation will posterity send Septimius into the centuries? What name will this wickedness have from those who call what Brutus did a crime?".

In the Massinger and Fletcher play The False One, Septimius is the central character, the "false one" of the title. He also appears in Pierre Corneille's La Mort de Pompée (1643). In 1910, John Masefield treated Pompey and Septimius in his play The Tragedy of Pompey the Great. Septimius also appears in George Shaw's play Caesar and Cleopatra. In the play, Caesar forgives him.

== In popular culture ==
In the video game Assassin's Creed Origins, one of the main antagonists, referred to either as Lucius Septimius or as "The Jackal", is based on him. This fictional version of Septimius is the second-in-command of the Order of the Ancients, a precursor organization to the Templar Order. Additionally, his story is greatly expanded from the historical record, being pardoned by Caesar and serving him until his assassination on the Ides of March, shortly before Caesar's own assassination.

In the television drama series Rome, he is portrayed by David Kennedy. Caesar orders his execution.

== See also ==
- Septimia gens
