= Achillas =

1st-century BC Greek general

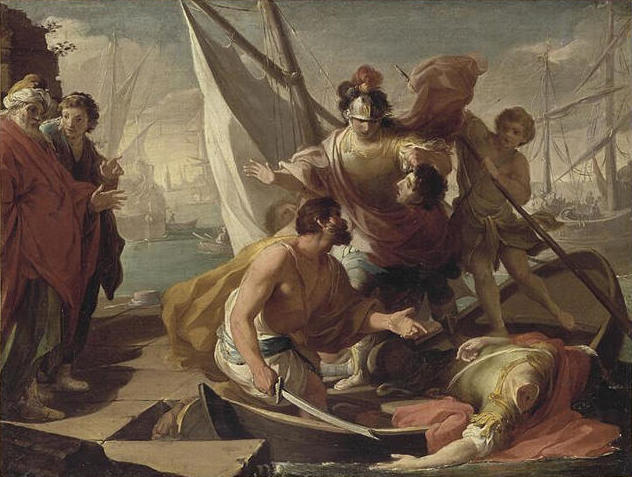
- Achillas assassinating Pompey
- Native name: Ἀχιλλᾶς
- Died: 47 BC Alexandria, Egypt
- Allegiance: Egypt
- Conflicts: Caesar's Civil War Second Siege of Alexandria †

Achillas (Greek: Ἀχιλλᾶς; died 47 BC) was one of the guardians of the Egyptian king Ptolemy XIII Theos Philopator, and commander of the king's troops, when Pompey fled to Egypt in September 48 BC. He was called by Julius Caesar a man of extraordinary daring, and it was he and Lucius Septimius who killed Pompey at the suggestion of the eunuch Pothinus and Theodotus of Chios.

Achillas subsequently joined Pothinus in resisting Caesar, and having had the command of the whole army entrusted to him by Pothinus, he marched against Alexandria with 20,000 infantry and 2,000 cavalry. Caesar, who was at Alexandria, did not have sufficient forces to oppose him, and sent ambassadors to negotiate with him. However, Achillas murdered the ambassadors to remove all hopes of reconciliation. He then marched into Alexandria and some of the city. Meanwhile, Arsinoe, the younger sister of Ptolemy, escaped from Caesar and joined Achillas. However, in 47 BC, dissension broke out between them, so Arsinoe had Achillas put to death by Ganymedes, a eunuch to whom she then entrusted the command of the forces.

== Depiction in drama ==
- Achillas is also a character in George Frideric Handel's Giulio Cesare, with his voice for a Bass. He is involved in the historically inaccurate love triangle between Cornelia, Ptolemy, and himself and the events surrounding it. Notable actors who portrayed him include John Tomlinson, Furio Zanasi, Alan Ewing, Tassis Christoyannis, and Guido Loconsolo.
- Achillas appears in the play Caesar and Cleopatra by George Bernard Shaw.
- In Joseph L. Mankiewicz's film Cleopatra, actor John Doucette portrays General Achillas.
- Achillas is the major antagonist of The Temple of the Muses, a novel by John Maddox Roberts, the fourth volume of his SPQR series.
- Achillas takes part in The Judgment of Caesar (part of the Roma Sub Rosa series by Steven Saylor) in which he kills Pompey.
- In the jointly-produced HBO-BBC TV series Rome, Achillas is portrayed by English actor Grant Masters.
