= Hierothesion =

A hierothesion (Ancient Greek ἱεροθέσιον 'holy seat'), in Commagene, is a monument or royal mausoleum.

It is also used separately for Nemrud Dagh archeology as a tomb in the form of a tumulus.

The term is used in particular in connection with three monuments:

- The Arsameia hierothesion for King Mithridates I Callinicus, built by his son King Antiochus I Theos of Commagene;
- The Mount Nemrut hierothesion for King Antiochus I Theos of Commagene;
- The Karakuş Tumulus hierothesion for Queen Isias and Princesses Antiochis of Commagene and Aka I of Commagene, built by Mithridates II of Commagene.
