= Antiochus of Commagene =

Antiochus of Commagene may refer to:

- Antiochus I Theos of Commagene
- Antiochus II of Commagene
- Antiochus III of Commagene
- Antiochus IV of Commagene
