= Antiochus Theos =

Antiochus Theos may refer to:

- Antiochus II Theos (286 BC–246 BC), third king of the Seleucid Empire
- Antiochus I Theos of Commagene (died 38 BC), king of Commagene
