= List of kings of Commagene =

Commagene was a small Irano-Hellenistic kingdom in southern Anatolia near Antioch, which began life as a tributary state of the Seleucid Empire and later became an independent kingdom, before eventually being annexed by the Roman Empire in 72.

== Satraps of Commagene, 290–163 BC ==
- Sames 290–260 BC
- Arsames I 260–228 BC
- Xerxes of Armenia 228–212 BC
- Ptolemaeus of Commagene 201–163 BC

== Kings of Commagene, 163 BC – 72 AD ==
- Ptolemaeus of Commagene 163–130 BC
- Sames II Theosebes Dikaios 130–109 BC
- Mithridates I Callinicus 109–70 BC
- Antiochus I of Commagene 70–38 BC
- Mithridates II of Commagene 38–20 BC
- Mithridates III of Commagene 20–12 BC
- Antiochus III of Commagene 12 BC – 17 AD
- Ruled by Rome 17–38
- Antiochus IV of Commagene 38–72 and wife, Julia Iotapa

== Descendants of the Kings of Commagene ==
- Gaius Julius Antiochus Epiphanes Philopappos
- Julia Balbilla
- Gaius Julius Agrippa
- Gaius Julius Alexander Berenicianus
- Julia (sister to Berenicianus), who married consul Gaius Julius Quadratus Bassus
- Jotapianus, possibly

== Sources ==
- Shayegan, M. Rahim (2016). "The Arsacids and Commagene". In Curtis, Vesta Sarkhosh; Pendleton, Elizabeth J.; Alram, Michael; Daryaee, Touraj (eds.). The Parthian and Early Sasanian Empires: Adaptation and Expansion. Oxbow Books. ISBN 9781785702082.
