= Laodice of Commagene =

Laodice (also spelled Laodike; Greek: Λαοδίκη; died 38 BC) was a princess from the Kingdom of Commagene and a queen of the Parthian Empire by marriage to Orodes II. She was of Greek and Iranian descent.

== Biography ==
Laodice was the first daughter born to King Antiochus I Theos of Commagene and Queen Isias Philostorgos.

She married King Orodes II of Parthia. Through this marriage, she became Queen of the Parthian Empire. In 38 BC Laodice and Orodes with their children, were killed in a parricidal and fratricidal massacre perpetrated by Phraates IV of Parthia to whom Orodes II handed over the Parthian throne after the death of Orodes’ son Pacorus I of Parthia in battle in 38 BC.

When Laodice died, her brother King Mithridates II of Commagene had her body returned to Commagene. She was buried near her mother Isias, her sister Antiochis of Commagene and her niece Aka I of Commagene. Mithridates in her honour built and dedicated a funeral monument.

== Tomb ==
The tomb tumulus of Laodice measures 21 metres or 69 feet. Only one column is still standing with a stele on top of it. The stele depicts a dexiosis relief or a scene between Mithridates II and Laodice shaking hands. The inscription underneath the dexiosis relief is so weathered that the inscription was not noticed until 1938. It was not until 1979 that the inscription was finally recorded and revealed:

The great King Mithridates, the son of the great King Antiochus and Queen Isias, dedicated this image to the unfading memory of Queen Laodice, the king’s sister and the wife of Orodes, the king of kings, and to her own honour.

This inscription dedicated to Laodice suggests a cenotaph, as Mithridates II is saying farewell to his sister, Laodice. The grave chamber of Laodice was located inside the tumulus. After the Kingdom of Commagene was annexed in 72 by the Roman Emperor Vespasian, her tomb was plundered. Romans removed stone blocks from her tomb and used the stones for construction projects in Commagene.

== Sources ==
- Boyce, Mary; Grenet, Frantz (1991). Beck, Roger (ed.). A History of Zoroastrianism, Zoroastrianism under Macedonian and Roman Rule. Leiden: Brill. ISBN 978-9004293915.
- Bivar, A.D.H. (1968). "The Political History of Iran Under the Arsacids". In Fischer, William B. (ed.). The Cambridge History of Iran. Vol. 3a. Cambridge: Cambridge University Press. pp. 21–99. ISBN 0-521-06935-1.
- "Travel Guide To Turkey, Guide de la Turquie, GUIDE MARTINE, Guide to Turkey, Guide de Turquie, Travel, Turkey, Voyage, Turquie, Istanbul, Turkey Photos, Photos de la Turquie". Guide-martine.com. Archived from the original on 2016-03-03.
- Roger Beck (2004). Beck on Mithraism: Collected Works with New Essays. Ashgate Pub. p. 297. ISBN 9780754640813.
- Widengren, G. (1986). "Antiochus of Commagene". Encyclopaedia Iranica, Vol. II, Fasc. 2. pp. 135–136.
