= Antiochus VIII Grypus =

King of the Seleucid Empire from 125 to 96 BC

Antiochus VIII Epiphanes
- Antiochus VIII Callinicus/Philometor
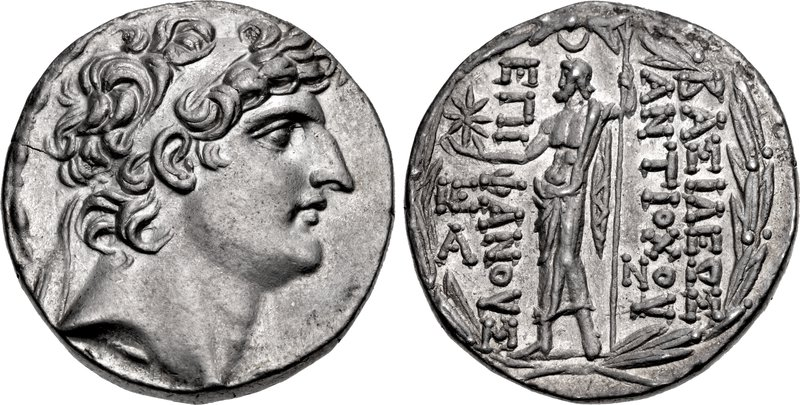
- Coin of Antiochus VIII

King of Syria
- Reign: 125–96 BC
- Coronation: 125 BC
- Predecessors: Cleopatra Thea, Seleucus V, Alexander II
- Successors: Antiochus IX, Seleucus VI
- Co-ruler: Cleopatra Thea (125–121 BC)
- Contenders: Alexander II (125–123 BC); Antiochus IX (116–96 BC)
- Born: Unknown
- Died: 96 BC
- Spouses: Tryphaena; Cleopatra Selene
- Issue: Seleucus VI; Antiochus XI; Philip I Demetrius III; Antiochus XII; Laodice, Queen of Commagene
- Dynasty: Seleucid
- Father: Demetrius II Nicator
- Mother: Cleopatra Thea

Antiochus VIII Epiphanes/Callinicus/Philometor, nicknamed Grypus (Greek: Γρυπός, "hook-nose"), was the ruler of the Hellenistic Seleucid Empire from 125 to 96 BC. He was the younger son of Demetrius II and Cleopatra Thea. He may have spent his early life in Athens and returned to Syria after the deaths of his father and brother Seleucus V. At first he was joint ruler with his mother. Fearing her influence, Antiochus VIII had Cleopatra Thea poisoned in 121 BC.

Political instability affected most of Antiochus VIII's reign. From 116 BC he fought a civil war against his half-brother Antiochus IX. Antiochus VIII's wife, the Ptolemaic Egyptian princess Tryphaena, had her sister and the wife of Antiochus IX, the former Cleopatra IV of Egypt, murdered in 112 BC; Antiochus IX killed Tryphaena in revenge. In 102 BC, Antiochus VIII's aunt Cleopatra III of Egypt, the mother of the two rival queens, gave him the hand of her daughter Cleopatra Selene in marriage. Antiochus VIII was assassinated in 96 BC.

== Biography ==
=== Family background and childhood ===
In 193 BC Cleopatra, a Seleucid princess, married King Ptolemy V of Egypt. Their granddaughter Cleopatra Thea of the Ptolemaic dynasty married the claimant Alexander Balas half a century later in 150 BC. She later married Demetrius II of Syria, and they had two sons. (Note: Antiochus VIII, the younger, was born sometime between 143 and 140 BC; he was between 15 and 17 when he took the throne. He may have been sent to Athens to prevent competition for the throne. However, this is not certain. In any case, he was in Syria in 125 BC.) Demetrius II was captured and held as a prisoner by the Parthian Empire. Antiochus VIII's uncle Antiochus VII took the throne and married Cleopatra Thea, but died in 129 BC while fighting against the Parthians; Demetrius II then returned to the throne, and died in 125 BC while waging a war for the Syrian throne against the claimant Alexander II. Demetrius II's eldest son Seleucus V became king after his death, but was soon killed by Cleopatra Thea. She made Antiochus VIII king, ruling as his co-regent.

=== Rise to power ===
Shortly after taking the throne, Antiochus VIII married his cousin, the Ptolemaic princess Tryphaena. Silver and bronze coins issued during the co-regency (125–121 BC) of Antiochus VIII and Cleopatra Thea show the head of the queen appearing at front with her son's head behind hers. Her name is also the first listed on the coinage. These facts signify that she was the senior co-ruler. He defeated usurper Alexander II Zabinas in 123 BC. In 121 BC, Antiochus decided to rid himself of his influential mother. According to Justin, his mother tried to poison him with wine, but the suspicious king forced her to drink the cup herself. However, it was Grypus himself who would become famous for his interest in toxicology. Some poems about poisonous herbs believed to have been written by him are quoted by the famous physician Galen.

=== Reign as King of Syria ===
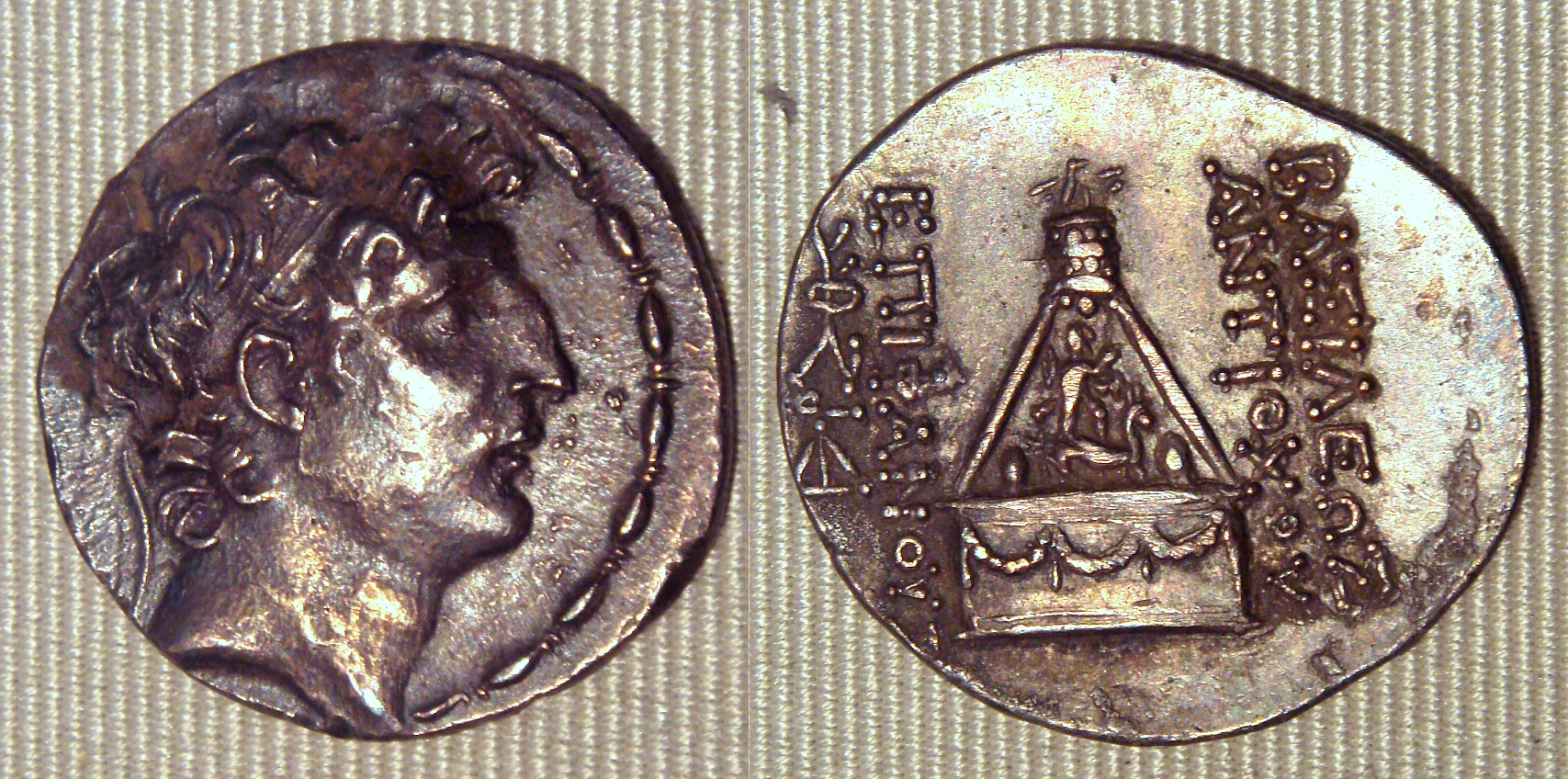
Coin of Antiochus VIII Grypus. Reverse: god Sandan standing on the horned lion, in his pyre surmounted by an eagle.

Despite political shortcomings, Grypus was a popular king. His ugly, lazy appearance on coins (common among the last Seleucids), together with stories of his lavish banquets, made posterity believe his dynasty was degenerate and decadent. This was, however, a conscious image invoking the Hellenistic concept of Tryphe - meaning good life, which the last Seleucids strove to be associated with, as opposed to the exhausting civil wars and feuds which troubled their reigns in reality.

A story of his luxurious parties claims he sent food home with guests who attended banquets, complete with a camel as beast of burden, as well as an attendant to carry the guest himself. This should certainly have caused some strain on the already depleted treasury.

=== Civil War ===
In 116 BC his half-brother and cousin Antiochus IX Cyzicenus returned from exile and a civil war began. Cyzicenus' wife, also named Cleopatra, was a sister of Tryphaena and was eventually killed in a dramatic fashion in the temple of Daphne outside Antioch, on the order of Tryphaena. Cyzicenus eventually killed Tryphaena as revenge. The two brothers then divided Syria between them until Grypus was killed by his minister Heracleon in 96 BC.

== Family ==
He married the Ptolemaic princess Tryphaena ca. 125, and had six children by her:

- Seleucus VI Epiphanes
- Antiochus XI Epiphanes Philadelphus
- Philip I Philadelphus
- Demetrius III Eucaerus
- Antiochus XII Dionysus
- Laodice VII Thea, married to king Mithridates I Callinicus of Commagene as part of a settlement by Mithridates' father Sames II Theosebes Dikaios to ensure peace between the Kingdom of Commagene and the Seleucid Empire. Laodice and Mithridates' son was King Antiochus I Theos of Commagene, grandson to Grypus.

In 102, Cleopatra III of Egypt gave him her daughter Cleopatra Selene I in marriage, but she gave him no children. Afterwards, she went to marry Antiochus IX Cyzicenus.

== See also ==
- List of Syrian monarchs
- Timeline of Syrian history

== Sources ==
- Whitehorne, John (1994). Cleopatras. Routledge. ISBN 978-0-415-05806-3.
- Wright, Nicholas L. (2008). "A note on Cleopatra Thea, Antiochus Grypus, and Athens". Mediterranean Archaeology. 21: 39–42. JSTOR 24651722.

Antiochus VIII Grypus Seleucid dynasty Born: Unknown Died: 96 BC
Preceded by Cleopatra Thea	Seleucid King (King of Syria); 125–96 BC with Cleopatra Thea (126–121/3 BC)	Succeeded by Antiochus IX Cyzicenus
