= Antiochus I of Commagene =

King of Commagene from 70 to 31 BC

Antiochus I Theos
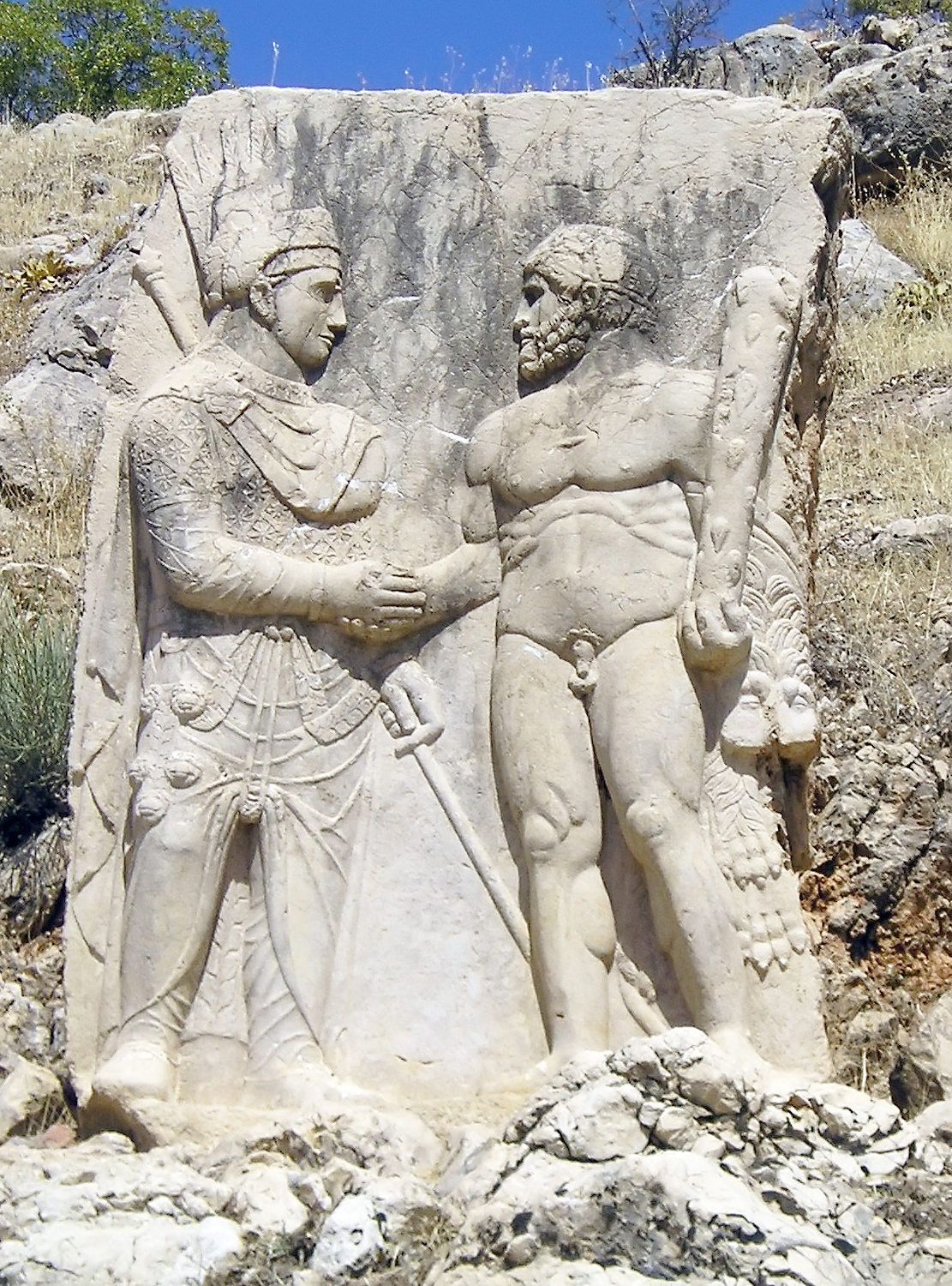
- Antiochus I or his father (left) shaking hands with Herakles-Artagnes-Ares (at Arsameia)

King of Commagene
- Reign: 70–31 BC
- Predecessor: Mithridates I Callinicus
- Successor: Mithridates II
- Died: 31 BC
- Burial: Mount Nemrut
- Issue: Mithridates II; Laodice of Parthia; Antiochus II; Antiochis; Athenais
Names
- Antiochus Theos Dikaios Epiphanes Philorhomaios Philhellenos
- House: Orontid dynasty
- Father: Mithridates I Callinicus
- Mother: Laodice VII Thea
- Religion: Greco-Iranian religious syncretism

Antiochus I Theos Dikaios Epiphanes Philorhomaios Philhellen (Ancient Greek: Ἀντίοχος ὁ Θεὸς Δίκαιος Ἐπιφανὴς Φιλορωμαῖος Φιλέλλην, meaning "Antiochos, the just, eminent god, friend of Romans and friend of Greeks", ruled 70–31 BC) was king of the Greco-Iranian kingdom of Commagene and the most famous king of that kingdom.

The ruins of the tomb-sanctuary of Antiochus atop Mount Nemrut in Turkey were added to the UNESCO World Heritage list in 1987. Several sandstone bas reliefs discovered at the site contain some of the oldest known images of two figures shaking hands. The reliefs portrayed Greco-Iranian deities, along with the goddess Commagene and also even Antiochus himself represented in a deified status. Antiochus was one of the last rulers of a Persian-Macedonian court before the advent of the Romans.

== Family, ancestry and early life ==
Antiochus I was the son of king Mithridates I Callinicus and queen Laodice VII Thea of Commagene. Antiochus was half Iranian, a distant member of the Orontid dynasty, and half Greek. (Note: “After taking over my paternal dominion (archē) […] I proclaimed that the kingdom (basileia) subject to my throne should be the common dwelling place of all the gods; and I decorated it with representations of their forms by all the kinds of art that the ancient traditions (logos) of Persians and Greeks – the fortunate roots of my ancestry – had handed down [to me], and honored them with sacrifices and festivals in accordance with the original law (nomos) and common practice (ethos) of all mankind ”) He claimed to have been a descendant of Alexander the Great.

Antiochus' father Mithridates was the son of King Sames II Theosebes Dikaios of Commagene and an unidentified woman. Mithridates was possibly related to the kings of Parthia and, in the light of archaeological discoveries at Mount Nemrut, claimed descent from Orontes and also claimed Darius I of Persia as an ancestor, thanks to Orontes' marriage to Rhodogune, daughter of Artaxerxes II, who was a descendant of king Darius I.

More certain are his dynastic connections to the Diadochi. Antiochus’ mother, Laodice VII Thea, was a Greek princess of the Seleucid Empire. Laodice's father was the Seleucid King Antiochus VIII Grypus, while her mother was a Ptolemaic princess and later Seleucid Queen Tryphaena (see Cleopatra VI of Egypt). Thus, Antiochus was a direct descendant of Seleucus I Nicator of the Seleucid Empire, Ptolemy I Soter of Egypt, Antigonus I Monophthalmus of Macedonia and Asia, Lysimachus of Thrace and the Macedonian regent, Antipater. These five men, the Diadochi 'successors', had served as generals under Alexander the Great. Antiochus’ parents had married as part of a peace alliance between their kingdoms. Little is known of his early life and education, aside from its philhellenic aspect; however, it seems that when his father died in 70 BC, Antiochus succeeded his father as king.

Antiochus married Isias, daughter of King Ariobarzanes I of Cappadocia. They had five children:

- Mithridates II of Commagene, succeeded Antiochus as King of Commagene after his death in 31 BC
- Laodice, who married King Orodes II of Parthia
- Prince Antiochus II of Commagene
- Antiochis of Commagene

== Reign ==
Commagene was a minor kingdom located in the highlands of northern Syria; to the north, it bordered Cappadocia, while it bordered Osroene to the south. It was initially a vassal state of the Seleucids, where it was considerably Hellenized. In the 1st century BC, however, Iranian culture experienced a resurgence, intentionally supported by Commagene in order to highlight its ancient ancestry and refute Seleucid, Parthian and Roman claims over the area. Under Antiochus, his kingdom experienced hardships during the Roman war with Pontus and Armenia. Armenia at first managed to extend its influence over Commagene, but Antiochus was ultimately forced to side with the Romans when the commander Pompey declared war against him.

Antiochus claims in his inscription on Mount Nemrut that he was a "friend of the Romans" (philoromaios), but was seen with some distrust by a few of the informants of Roman politician Cicero. His Iranian lineage made him lean toward the Parthian realm. He enjoyed good relations with the king of Media Atropatene, Darius, who seemingly helped him against Pompey. Antiochus made an alliance with the Parthian monarch Orodes II (r. 57–37 BC), which was cemented with Orodes' marriage to Antiochus' daughter, Laodice. However, in 51 BC Antiochus provided Cicero with intelligence of the movements of a Parthian force led by prince Pacorus I. Ultimately Antiochus chose the Parthians over the Romans. In 38 BCE, Pacorus was defeated and killed by the Romans; the remnants of his army fled to Commagene, where they took refuge.

The Roman general Publius Ventidius marched towards Commagene to punish Antiochus for his desertion. He laid siege to the capital Samosata, where Antiochus resided. Antiochus attempted to reach a compromise by offering 1,000 talents as reimbursement and a renewed alliance with the Romans. The Roman commander-in-chief Mark Antony declined the offer and had Ventidius dismissed, himself taking over the siege. He was, however, unable to capture the capital, and instead resorted to accept Antiochus' new offer of 300 talents. The life of Antiochus becomes obscure after this; according to Cassius Dio, he was killed by the Parthian king Phraates IV, in c. 31 BC.

== Mount Nemrut ==
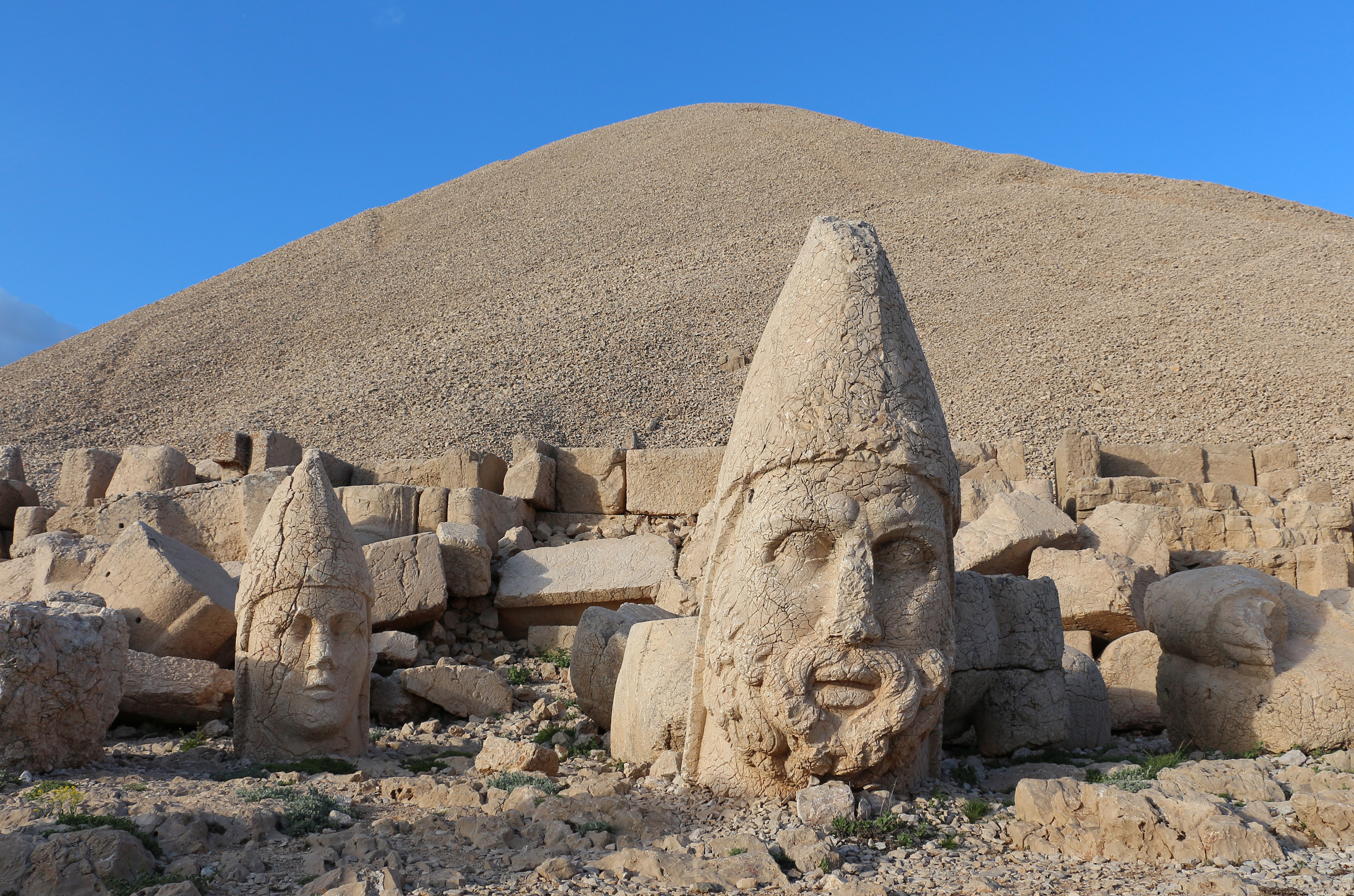
Statues of gods and the pyramid-like tomb-sanctuary of King Antiochus Theos of Commagene rising behind, atop Mount Nemrut

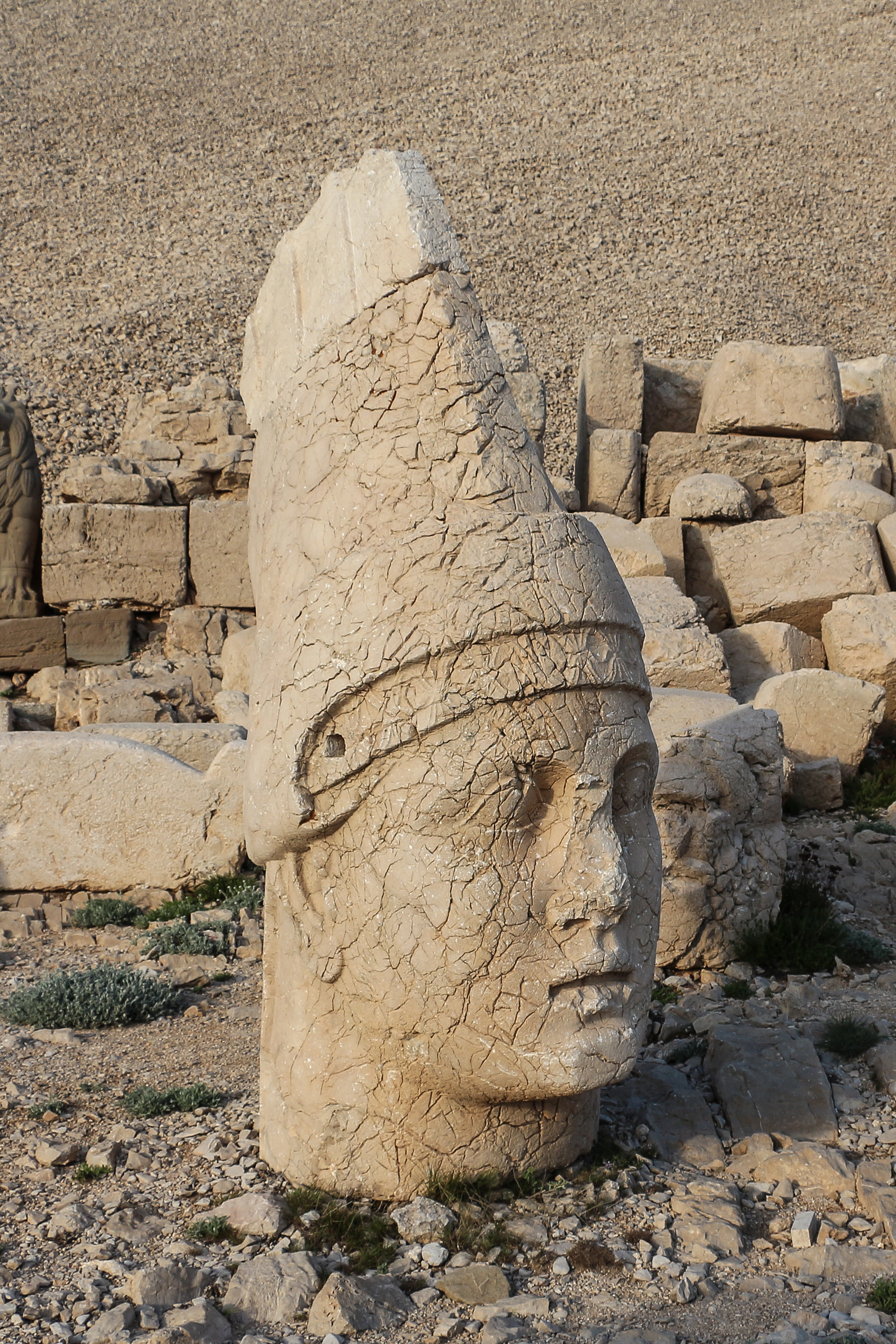
Head of Antiochus atop Mount Nemrut

Antiochus is famous for building the impressive religious sanctuary of Mount Nemrut. When Antiochus reigned as king he was creating a royal cult for himself and preparing to be worshipped after his death. Antiochus was inspired to create his own cult in the Greek form of the religion Zoroastrianism. Antiochus left many Greek inscriptions revealing many aspects of his religion and explaining his purpose of action. In one inscription, Antiochus directed that his tomb should be built in a high and holy place, remote from people and close to the gods, among whom he would be numbered. Antiochus wanted his body to be preserved for eternity. The gods he worshipped were a syncretism of Greek and Iranian gods, such as Heracles-Artagnes-Ares, Zeus-Oromasdes, and Apollo-Mithras-Helios-Hermes. The monumental effigies at the site show both Persian and Greek iconographic influences: Persian influences can be seen in the clothes, headgear and the colossal size of the images, while the depiction of their physical features derives from Greek artistic style.

Antiochus practised astrology of a very esoteric kind, and laid the basis for a calendrical reform, by linking the Commagenian year, which until then had been based on the movements of the Moon, to the Sothic (Star of Sirius) cycle used by the Egyptians as the basis of their calendar. This would suggest that Antiochus was knowledgeable about, if not fully initiated into Hermeticism.

Antiochus’ tomb complex was constructed in a way that religious festivities could occur there. Every month there were two feast days for Antiochus: His coronation, which was celebrated on the 10th of each month, and his birthday, which was celebrated on the 16th of each month. He allocated funds for these events from properties legally bound to the site. He also appointed families of priests and hierodules to conduct the rituals, and their descendants were intended to continue the ritual service in perpetuity. The priests wore traditional Persian robes and adorned the images of the gods and Antiochus' ancestors with gold crowns. The priests offered incense, herbs, and other unspecified "splendid sacrifices" on altars set before each image. All the citizens and military were invited to the banquets in honour of the illustrious deceased. During the feasts, grudging attitudes were forbidden and Antiochus decreed that the people should enjoy themselves, drink wine, eat, and listen to the sacred music performed by the temple musicians.

Antiochus’ tomb was forgotten for centuries, until 1883 when archaeologists from Germany excavated it. From his found inscriptions, Antiochus appears to have been a pious person and had a generous spirit. The ruins of the royal palace have been found in another city of the kingdom, Arsameia. This palace is known as Eski Kale or 'Old Castle'. In Arsameia, Antiochus left many inscriptions in Greek describing his public works program, and how he glorified the city.

== Ancestry ==
Ancestors of Antiochus I of Commagene

8. King Ptolemaeus of Commagene
4. King Sames II Theosebes Dikaios of Commagene
2. King MithridatesI Callinicus of Commagene
5. Princess Pythodoris of Pontus
1. Antiochus I Theos of Commagene
12. King Demetrius II Nicator of the Seleucid Empire
6. King Antiochus VIII Grypus of the Seleucid Empire
13. Princess Cleopatra Thea of Egypt
3. Princess Laodice VII Thea of the Seleucid Empire
14. Ptolemy VIII Physcon of Egypt
7. Princess Tryphaena of Egypt
15. Cleopatra III of Egypt

== Sources ==
- "Guide de la Turquie, Guide de Turquie" [Guide to Turkey]. Guide Martine (guide-martine.com) (in Spanish and French). Archived from the original on 2016-03-03. "Travel Guide to Turkey, Travel, Turkey, Voyage, Turquie, Istanbul, Turkey Photos, Photos de la Turquie"
- Speidel, Michael Alexander (24 August 2005). Early Roman rule in Commagene (PDF) (Report). Mavors Institute. Archived from the original (PDF) on 27 December 2015.
- Smith, William, ed. (1870). "Antiochus I". Dictionary of Greek and Roman Biography and Mythology. Vol. 1. p. 193. Archived from the original on 1 January 2006 – via ancientlibrary.com.
- Bennett, Chris, ed. (c. 2006). "Tryphaena". Egyptian Royal Genealogy. Archived from the original on 19 May 2009 – via Tyndale House (tyndale.cam.ac.uk).
- Campbell-Scott, Roger (1988). "Nimrud Dagh – a sacred mountain in Anatolia". Vanished Civilizations: The hidden secrets of lost cities and forgotten peoples. Hong Kong, CN: Reader's Digest Services. pp. 194–197. ISBN 978-0-276-42658-2.
- Ball, Warwick (2002). Rome in the East: The transformation of an empire. Routledge. ISBN 978-1-134-82387-1 – via Google Books.
- Canepa, Matthew (2010). "Achaemenid and Seleukid royal funerary practices and middle Iranian kingship". In Börm, Henning; Weisehöfer, Josef (eds.). Commutatio et Contentio: Studies in the Late Roman, Sasanian, and Early Islamic Middle East in Memory of Zeev Rubin. Dusseldorf, DE: Wellem. pp. 1–21 – via academia.edu.
- Dąbrowa, Edward (2018). "Arsacid dynastic marriages". Electrum. 25: 73–83. doi:10.4467/20800909EL.18.005.8925.
- Beck, R. (2004). Beck on Mithraism: Collected works with new essays. Ashgate. p. 297. ISBN 978-0-7546-4081-3.
- Widengren, G. (1986). "Antiochus of Commagene". Encyclopaedia Iranica. Vol. II, Fasc. 2, pages 135–136.
- Merz, Annette; Tieleman, Teun L. (2012). The Letter of Mara bar Sarapion in Context: Proceedings of the Symposium Held at Utrecht University, 10–12 December 2009. Leiden: Brill. ISBN 978-90-04-23301-0.
- Babaie, Sussan; Grigor, Talinn (2015). Persian Kingship and Architecture: Strategies of power in Iran from the Achaemenids to the Pahlavis. I.B. Tauris. pp. 1–288. ISBN 978-0-85773-477-8.
- Erskine, Andrew; Llewellyn-Jones, Lloyd; Wallace, Shane (2017). The Hellenistic Court: Monarchic power and elite society from Alexander to Cleopatra. The Classical Press of Wales. ISBN 978-1-910589-62-5.
- Garsoian, Nina (2005). "Tigran II". Encyclopaedia Iranica.
- Marciak, Michał (2017). Sophene, Gordyene, and Adiabene: Three regna minora of northern Mesopotamia between east and west. Brill. ISBN 978-90-04-35072-4.
- Sartre, Maurice (2005). The Middle East under Rome. Harvard University Press. ISBN 978-0-674-01683-5.
- Shayegan, M. Rahim (2016). "The Arsacids and Commagene". In Curtis, Vesta Sarkhosh; Pendleton, Elizabeth J.; Alram, Michael; Daryaee, Touraj (eds.). The Parthian and Early Sasanian Empires: Adaptation and expansion. Oxbow Books. ISBN 978-1-78570-208-2.
- Strootman, Rolf (2021). "Orontid kingship in its Hellenistic context: The Seleucid connections of Antiochos I of Kommagene". In Michael, Blömer; Riedel, Stefan; Versluys, Miguel John; Winter, Engelbert (eds.). Common Dwelling Place of all the Gods. Franz Steiner Verlag Wiesbaden Gmbh. pp. 295–317.

Preceded by Mithridates I Callinicus	King of Commagene; 70–31 BCE	Succeeded by Mithridates II
