= Antigonus (Seleucid admiral) =

Antigonus, son of Menophilus was a Seleucid official (nauarchos). He served under king Alexander (I or II), in the mid-2nd century BC. He is known from an inscription found in the city of Miletus.

== The inscription ==
The inscription of Antigonus was found in 1963 on a marble block which was part of the Gotenmauer wall in Miletus. (Note: The inscription's entry in the "Milet: Ergebnisse der Ausgrabungen und Untersuchungen seit dem Jahr 1899" is number 422. The Gotenmauer was a wall built in c. 262 to defend Miletus against the invasion of Goths.) In the view of Peter Herrmann, the re-used block came from the necropolis of the city. The first two lines read:

Ἀντίγονος Μηνοφίλου ὁ γενόμενος ναύαρχος Ἀλε-
ξάνδρου τοῦ Συρίας βασιλέως·

Antígonos Mēnophílou ho genómenos naúarchos Ale-
xándrou toû Syrías Basiléо̄s.

=== Importance ===
The first lines translate as "Antigonus, son of Menophilus, the former admiral of Alexander, king of Syria" (either Alexander I Balas or Alexander II Zabinas).

The inscription is important for understanding the Seleucid dynasty's self-representation. Ancient hostile historians designated the Seleucid kings as kings of Syria or "kings who reigned in Syria". Those designations were understood by traditional scholarship as mockery that emphasized the loss of Seleucid lands outside Syria; the inscription of Antigonus, a Seleucid official of the highest rank, proved that the geographical association of the Seleucids with the kingdom of Syria came from the dynasty's own self-representation.
