= Antiochus VII Sidetes =

King of Seleucid Empire from 138 to 129 BC

Antiochus VII Euergetes
- Antiochus VII Sidetes
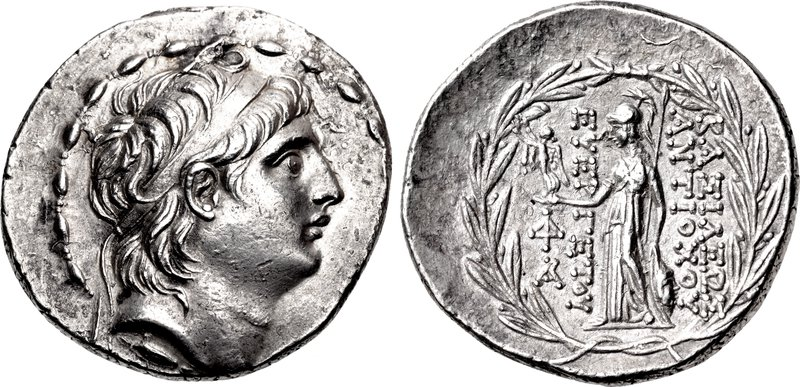

Basileus of the Seleucid Empire
- Reign: July/August 138 – 129 BC
- Predecessor: Diodotus Tryphon
- Successor: Alexander II Zabinas (false son); Demetrius II Nicator (elder brother)
- Born: c. 164 / 160 BC
- Died: 129 BC (aged about 30); Ecbatana, Iran during the Battle of Ecbatana
- Consort: Cleopatra Thea
- Issue: Antiochus IX Cyzicenus; Alexander II Zabinas (claimed); Laodice (wife of Phraates II); Seleucus
- Dynasty: Seleucid dynasty
- Father: Demetrius I Soter
- Mother: possibly Laodice V

Antiochus VII Euergetes (Greek: Ἀντίοχος Ευεργέτης; c. 164/160 BC – 129 BC), nicknamed Sidetes (Greek: Σιδήτης) (from Side, a city in Asia Minor), also known as Antiochus the Pious, was ruler of the Hellenistic Seleucid Empire from July/August 138 to 129 BC. He campaigned to retake territories lost to the Parthians. After Antiochus was killed in battle, the Seleucid realm was restricted to Syria.

== Biography ==
=== Early life and early reign ===
He was one of the sons of Demetrius I Soter, the brother of Demetrius II Nicator and his mother may have been Laodice V. Antiochus was elevated after Demetrius was captured by the Parthians. He married Cleopatra Thea, who had been the wife of Demetrius. Their offspring was Antiochus IX, who thus became both half-brother and cousin to Seleucus V and Antiochus VIII.

In his nine-year reign, Antiochus made some effort to undo the massive territorial and authority losses of recent decades. Antiochus defeated the usurper Diodotus Tryphon at Dora and laid siege to Jerusalem in 134 BC. During the siege he allowed a seven-day truce for the Jews to celebrate a religious festival, impressing the Jewish leadership. According to Josephus the Hasmonean leader John Hyrcanus opened King David's sepulchre and removed three thousand talents, which he then paid Antiochus to spare the city. Nevertheless, King Antiochus' respectful treatment of the Jews, and respect for their religion, earned him their gratitude and added name Euergetes ("the Benefactor"). With no Jewish sources of that time (the Book of Maccabees ends a few years before his time), it is unclear if the siege of Jerusalem ended with a decisive Seleucid victory or simply a peace treaty. Furthermore, Jewish forces later assisted Antiochus in his wars, and for nearly 20 years after his death, John Hyrcanus refrained from attacking areas under Seleucid control.

=== Later territory disputes and defeat ===
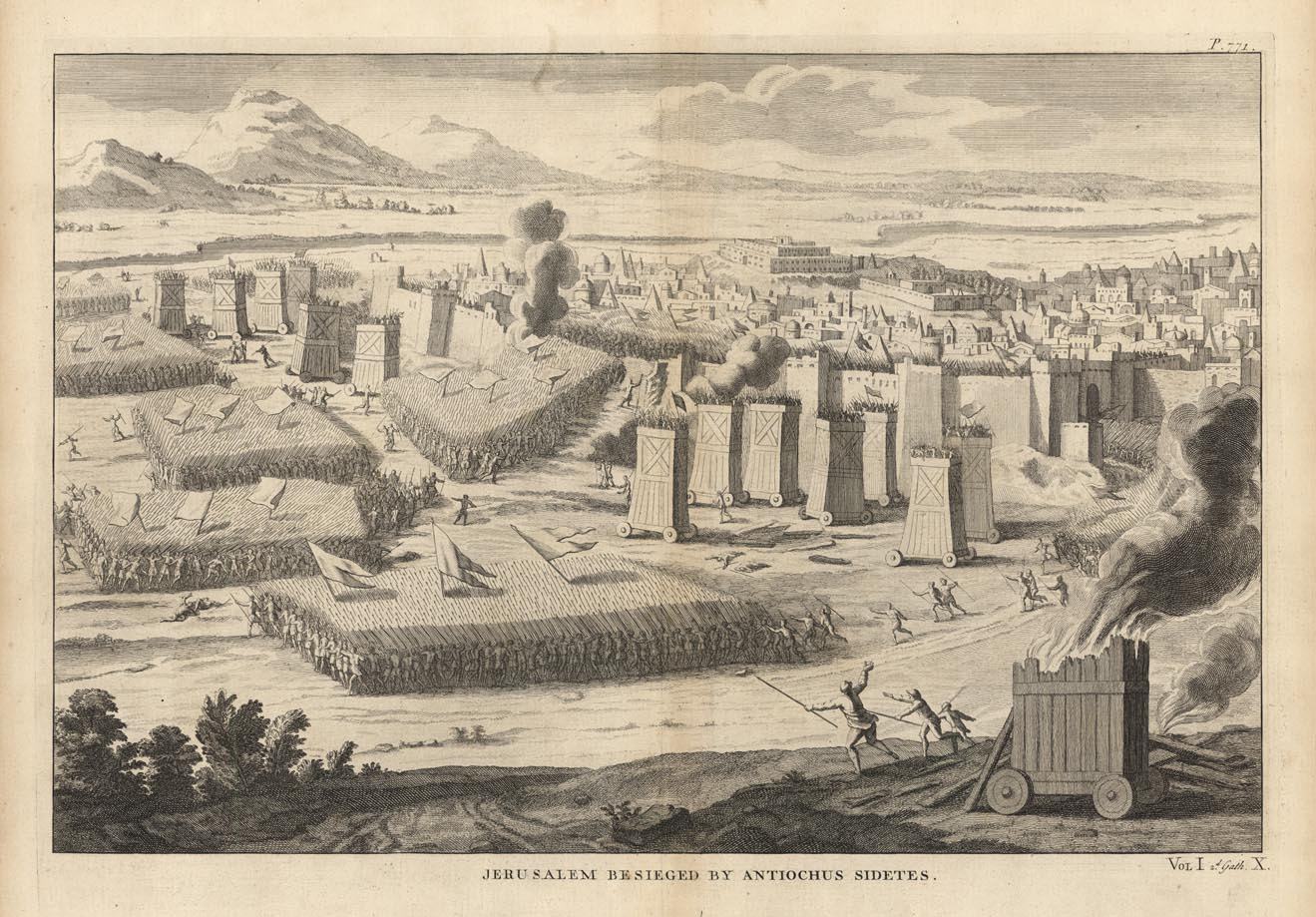
Jerusalem besieged by Antiochus Sidetes.

Antiochus spent the final years of his life attempting to reclaim the lost eastern territories, overrun by the Parthians under their "Great King", Mithridates I. Marching east, with what would prove to be the last great Seleucid royal army (including a unit of Judean troops under John Hyrcanus), he won three battles against the Parthians. He restored Mesopotamia, Babylonia and Media to the Seleucid empire, before dispersing his army into winter quarters.

The Seleucid king and army spent the winter feasting, hunting and drinking (the Seleucids maintained the Macedonian tradition of heavy drinking). As with any time an army is quartered upon a population, tensions soon grew between the locals and the Syrian troops.

The new Parthian ruler, Phraates II, had not been idle, he released his long-held prisoner, Demetrius II, Antiochus' older brother, who returned to Syria to reclaim the throne.

That winter (130–129 BC), several towns rose in rebellion and attacked their Seleucid garrisons. Antiochus marched to relieve his garrisons. While marching through the Zagros mountains, he was ambushed and killed by Phraates II and a large force of Parthians.

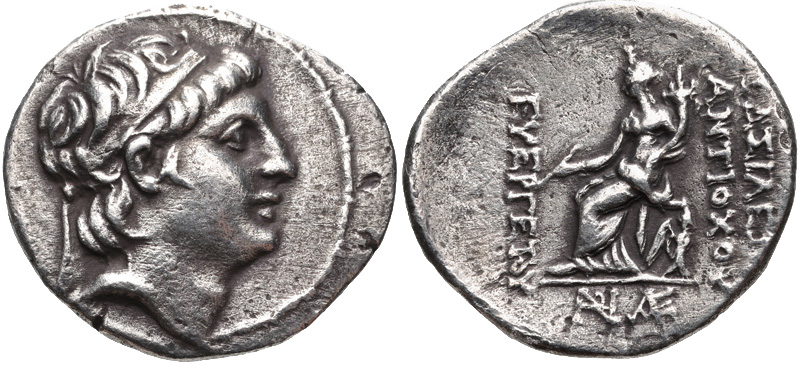
Silver coin of Antiochus VII Sidetes, with the reverse showing seated Tyche holding cornucopia. Greek legend reads: ΒΑΣΙΛΕΩΣ ΑΝΤΙΟΧΟΥ ΕΥΕΡΓΕΤΟΥ, Basileōs Antiochou Euergetou, "of king Antiochus, the benefactor."

=== Succession ===
Antiochus's confirmed heir was Antiochus IX Cyzicenus. But a fragment from book 16 of Posidonius' "Histories", which survives in the Deipnosophistae written by Athenaeus, mentions a king named Seleucus, who was captured in Media by king Arsaces and treated like royalty. The identity of this Seleucus have been a matter of debate; the possibility of Seleucus being a son of Antiochus VII captured after the death of his father is suggested by Felix Jacoby and, with reservations, by Ian G. Kidd.

== See also ==
- List of Syrian monarchs
- Timeline of Syrian history

== Sources ==
- Ceccarelli, Paola (2011). "Kings, Philosophers and Drunkards: Athenaeus' Information on the Seleucids". In Erickson, Kyle; Ramsey, Gillian (eds.). Seleucid Dissolution. The Sinking of the Anchor. Harrassowitz Verlag. p. 168. ISBN 978-3-447-06588-7. ISSN 1613-5628.
- Overtoom, Nikolaus Leo (2020). Reign of Arrows: The Rise of the Parthian Empire in the Hellenistic Middle East. Oxford University Press. ISBN 9780190888336.
- Shayegan, M. Rahim (2011). Arsacids and Sasanians: Political Ideology in Post-Hellenistic and Late Antique Persia. Cambridge University Press. ISBN 9780521766418.

Antiochus VII Sidetes Seleucid dynasty Born: c. 164/160 BC Died: 129 BC
Preceded by Diodotus Tryphon	Seleucid King (King of Syria); 138–129 BC	Succeeded by Demetrius II Nicator and Alexander II Zabinas
