= Laodice VII Thea =

Selucid princess

Laodice VII Thea Philadelphus (Greek: Λαοδίκη ἡ Θεά καὶ Φιλάδελφος, born after 122 BC, was a princess of the Seleucid Empire and future queen of Commagene. She was the daughter of King Antiochus VIII Grypus and Greek Ptolemaic Princess Cleopatra Tryphaena, a daughter of Ptolemy VIII Physcon.

Laodice married Mithridates I Callinicus, a prince and future king from the Kingdom of Commagene. The fathers of Laodice and Mithridates had arranged their marriage as part of a peace alliance between their kingdoms. Mithridates embraced the Greek culture. Laodice bore Mithridates a son, Antiochus I Theos of Commagene (c. 86 BC–38 BC). Antiochus became a prince and future king of Commagene.
