= Tryphaena =

Queen consort of the Seleucid Empire
- Tenure: 124 BC–111 BC (in opposition to her sister Cleopatra IV until 112 BC)
- Coronation: 124 BC
- Predecessors: Cleopatra Thea and Seleucus V Philometor
- Successor: Queen consort Cleopatra Selene
- Born: c. 141 BC
- Died: 111 BC
- Spouse: Antiochus VIII Grypus
- Issue: Seleucus VI Epiphanes; Antiochus XI Epiphanes; Philip I Philadelphus; Demetrius III Eucaerus; Antiochus XII Dionysus; Laodice
- Dynasty: Ptolemaic
- Father: Ptolemy VIII Physcon
- Mother: Cleopatra III

Cleopatra Tryphaena (Ancient Greek: Κλεοπάτρα Τρύφαινα; c. 141 BC – 111 BC), well known simply as Tryphaena; was a Ptolemaic princess. She married the Seleucid king Antiochus VIII Grypus and was queen of Syria (124–111 BC).

== Biography ==
=== Early life and Queen of Syria ===
She was the oldest daughter of the Egyptian king Ptolemy VIII Physcon and his niece, step-daughter and wife Cleopatra III. Therefore, she was the sister of Ptolemy IX Lathyros, Ptolemy X Alexander I, Cleopatra IV and Cleopatra Selene.

In 124 BC Ptolemy VIII broke with his former ally Alexander II Zabinas, instead supporting Antiochus VIII Grypus, the son of Demetrius II Nicator and Cleopatra Thea. As part of the new policy, Ptolemy VIII married his daughter Tryphaena to Antiochus VIII and also sent him reinforcements. The couple had five sons: Seleucus VI Epiphanes, the twins Antiochus XI Epiphanes and Philip I Philadelphus, Demetrius III Eucaerus, and Antiochus XII Dionysus. Their one daughter, Laodice, married Mithridates I Callinicus.

=== Feud with Cleopatra IV and death ===
In 112 BC Antiochus VIII defeated his stepbrother and rival Antiochus IX Cyzicenus, and took Antioch, where Cleopatra IV, the wife of Antiochus IX, stayed. Tryphaena hated her sister Cleopatra IV, who had taken refuge in the temple of Apollo, and wanted her to be killed. She accused Cleopatra IV of introducing foreign armies into the dispute between the Seleucid stepbrothers and marrying outside Egypt against the will of her mother. Antiochus VIII asked his wife in vain to spare her sister. He said that his ancestors had never dealt so violently with women. He added that the temple, where Cleopatra IV had taken refuge, was sacred, and that he had to respect the gods, with whose help he had won. But Tryphaena was not to be persuaded by her husband and ordered several soldiers to execute her sister. They penetrated into the temple and killed Cleopatra IV. Before dying Cleopatra IV cursed her murderers and left her revenge to the discretion of the dishonoured gods.

A year later, in 111 BC, Tryphaena was taken prisoner by Antiochus IX after he had beaten his stepbrother in another battle. Antiochus IX had her executed and sacrificed her to the manes of his wife.

== See also ==
- List of Syrian monarchs
- Timeline of Syrian history

== Notes ==
Tryphaena Seleucid dynasty Born: c. 141 BC Died: 111 BC
| Preceded by Cleopatra Thea | Seleucid Queen (Queen Consort of Syria); 124 BC–111 BC with Cleopatra Thea (125–121 BC); Antiochus VIII Grypus (125–96 BC) | Succeeded by Cleopatra Selene |
