= Alexander II Zabinas =

King of the Seleucid Empire from 128 to 123 BC

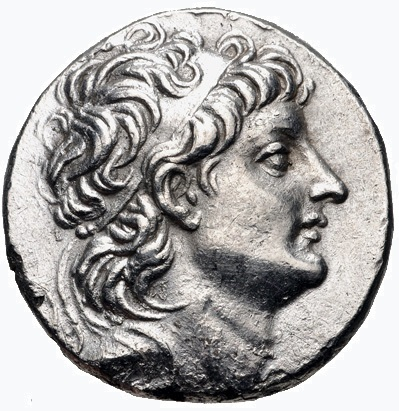
- Alexander II's portrait on the obverse of a tetradrachm

King of Syria
- Reign: 128–123 BC
- Predecessor: Demetrius II
- Successor: Cleopatra Thea, Antiochus VIII
- Born: c. 150 BC
- Died: 123 BC
- Dynasty: Seleucid
- Father: Probably Alexander I

Alexander II Theos Epiphanes Nikephoros (Ancient Greek: Ἀλέξανδρος Θεὸς Ἐπιφανὴς Νικηφόρος Aléxandros Theòs Epiphanḕs Nikēphóros, surnamed Zabinas; c. 150 BC – 123 BC) was a Hellenistic-era Seleucid monarch who reigned as the King of Syria between 128 BC and 123 BC. His true parentage is debated; depending on which ancient historian, he either claimed to be a son of Alexander I or an adopted son of Antiochus VII. Most ancient historians and the modern academic consensus maintain that Alexander II's claim to be a Seleucid was false. His surname "Zabinas" (Ζαβίνας) is a Semitic name that is usually translated as "the bought one". It is possible, however, that Alexander II was a natural son of Alexander I, as the surname can also mean "bought from the god". The iconography of Alexander II's coinage indicates he based his claims to the throne on his descent from Antiochus IV, the father of Alexander I.

Alexander II's rise is connected to the dynastic feuds of the Seleucid Empire. Both King Seleucus IV (d. 175 BC) and his brother Antiochus IV (d. 164 BC) had descendants contending for the throne, leading the country to experience many civil wars. The situation was complicated by Ptolemaic Egyptian interference, which was facilitated by the dynastic marriages between the two royal houses. In 128 BC, King Demetrius II of Syria, the representative of Seleucus IV's line, invaded Egypt to help his mother-in-law Cleopatra II who was engaged in a civil war against her brother and husband King Ptolemy VIII. Angered by the Syrian invasion, the Egyptian king instigated revolts in the cities of Syria against Demetrius II and chose Alexander II, a supposed representative of Antiochus IV's line, as an anti-king. With Egyptian troops, Alexander II captured the Syrian capital Antioch in 128 BC and warred against Demetrius II, defeating him decisively in 125 BC. The beaten king escaped to his wife Cleopatra Thea in the city of Ptolemais, but she expelled him. He was killed while trying to find refuge in the city of Tyre.

With the death of Demetrius II, Alexander II became the master of the kingdom, controlling the realm except for a small pocket around Ptolemais where Cleopatra Thea ruled. Alexander II was a beloved king, known for his kindness and forgiving nature. He maintained friendly relations with John I Hyrcanus of Judea, who acknowledged the Syrian king as his suzerain. Alexander II's successes were not welcomed by Egypt's Ptolemy VIII, who did not want a strong king on the Syrian throne. Thus, in 124 BC an alliance was established between Egypt and Cleopatra Thea, now ruling jointly with Antiochus VIII, her son by Demetrius II. Alexander II was defeated, and he escaped to Antioch, where he pillaged the temple of Zeus to pay his soldiers; the population turned against him, and he fled and was eventually captured. Alexander II was probably executed by Antiochus VIII in 123 BC, ending the line of Antiochus IV.

== Background ==
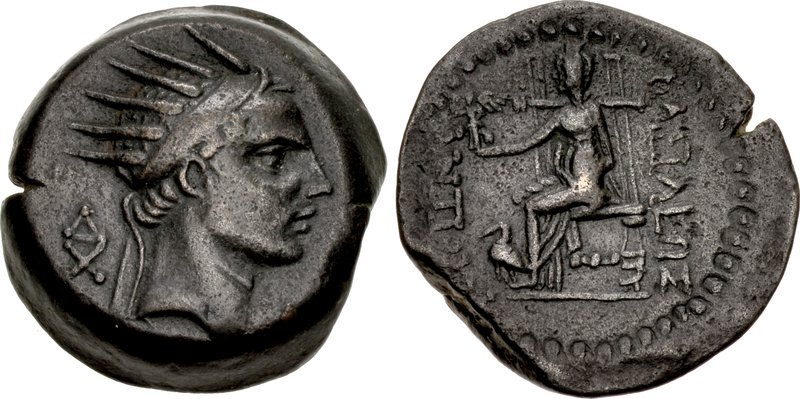
Tetrachalkon of Antiochus IV, possible grandfather of Alexander II

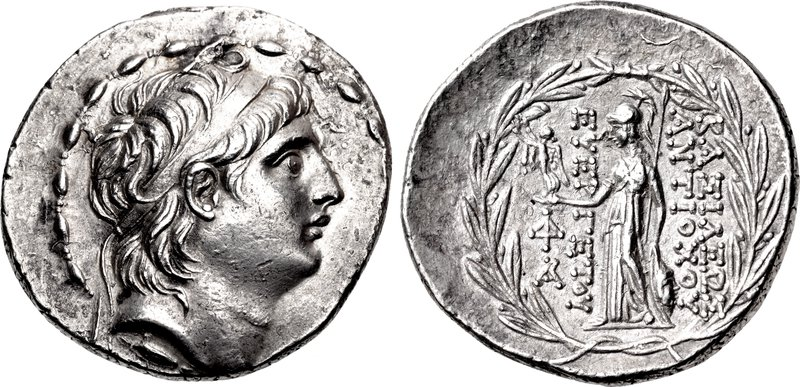
Tetradrachm of Antiochus VII, Alexander II's alleged adoptive father

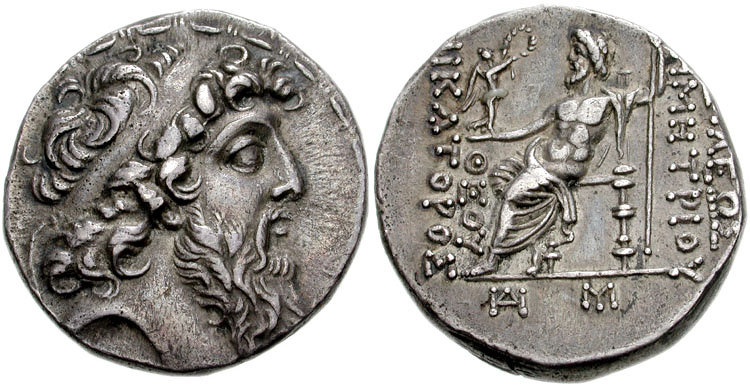
Tetradrachm of Demetrius II, Alexander II's opponent

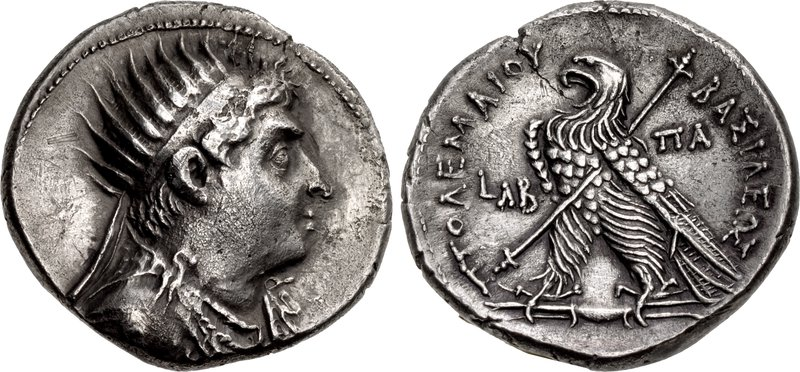
Tetradrachm of Ptolemy VIII, Alexander II's patron

The death of the Seleucid king Seleucus IV in 175 BC created a dynastic crisis because of the illegal succession of his brother Antiochus IV. Seleucus IV's legitimate heir, Demetrius I, was a hostage in Rome, (Note: According to the 188 BC Treaty of Apamea, King Antiochus III, who lost a war against Rome, agreed to send his son Antiochus IV as a hostage. After Antiochus III's death in 187 BC, his eldest son Seleucus IV replaced Antiochus IV with his own son Demetrius I, as the son of the ruling king was considered a better guarantee of loyalty by Rome. The exchange took place before 178 BC.) and his younger son Antiochus was declared king. Shortly after the succession of young Antiochus, however, Antiochus IV assumed the throne as a co-ruler. He may have had his nephew killed in 170/169 BC (145 SE (Seleucid year)). (Note: Some dates in the article are given according to the Seleucid era which is indicated when two years have a slash separating them. Each Seleucid year started in the late autumn of a Gregorian year; thus, a Seleucid year overlaps two Gregorian ones.) After Antiochus IV's death in 164 BC, his son Antiochus V succeeded him. Three years later Demetrius I managed to escape Rome and take the throne, killing Antiochus V in 161 BC. The Seleucid dynasty was torn apart by the civil war between the lines of Seleucus IV and Antiochus IV.

In 150 BC Alexander I, an illegitimate son of Antiochus IV, managed to dethrone and kill Demetrius I. He married Cleopatra Thea, the daughter of Ptolemy VI of Ptolemaic Egypt, who became his ally and supporter. The Egyptian king changed his policy and supported Demetrius I's son Demetrius II, marrying him to Cleopatra Thea after divorcing her from Alexander I, who was defeated by his former father in law and eventually killed in 145 BC. The Egyptian king was wounded during the battle and died shortly after Alexander I. His sister-wife and co-ruler, the mother of Cleopatra Thea, Cleopatra II, then married her other brother, Ptolemy VIII who became her new co-ruler.

Diodotus Tryphon, Alexander I's official, declared the latter's son Antiochus VI king in 144 BC. Tryphon then had him killed and assumed the throne himself in 142 BC. The usurper controlled lands in the western parts of the Seleucid empire, including Antioch, but Demetrius II retained large parts of the realm, including Babylonia, which was invaded by the Parthian Empire in 141 BC. This led Demetrius II to launch a campaign against Parthia which ended in his defeat and capture in 138 BC. His younger brother Antiochus VII took the throne and married Demetrius II's wife. He was able to defeat Tryphon and the Parthians, restoring the lost Seleucid provinces.

In Egypt, without divorcing Cleopatra II, Ptolemy VIII married her daughter by Ptolemy VI, Cleopatra III, and declared her co-ruler. (Note: Cleopatra III was not mentioned as a queen or a wife of Ptolemy VIII in a document dated to 8 May 141 BC. The first attestation of Cleopatra III as wife of Ptolemy VIII dates to 14 January 140 BC (P. dem. Amherst 51), thus, the marriage took place between May 141 BC and January 140 BC. The word for queen, "Pr-ʿȜ.t", is hard to read in P. dem. Amherst 51 as only traces of ink remain; the Egyptologist Pieter Pestman expressed his doubts of its existence, while the Egyptologist Giuseppina Lenzo, after inspecting the original document, considered the title's presence plausible.) Cleopatra II revolted and took control over the countryside. By September 131 BC, Ptolemy VIII lost recognition in the capital Alexandria and fled to Cyprus. The Parthians freed Demetrius II to put pressure on Antiochus VII, who was killed in 129 BC during a battle in Media. This opened the way for Demetrius II to regain his throne and wife Cleopatra Thea the same year. Ptolemy VIII returned to Egypt two years after his expulsion; he warred against his sister Cleopatra II, eventually besieging her in Alexandria; she then asked her son-in-law Demetrius II for help, offering him the throne of Egypt. The Syrian king marched against Egypt and by spring 128 BC, he reached Pelusium.

In response to Demetrius II's campaign, Ptolemy VIII incited a rebellion in Syria. The Syrian capital Antioch proclaimed a young son of Antiochus VII named Antiochus Epiphanes king, but the city was willing to change hands in such unstable political circumstances. Ptolemy VIII sent Alexander II as an anti-king for Syria, forcing Demetrius II to withdraw from Egypt. According to the third century historian Porphyry, in his history preserved in the work of his contemporary Eusebius, and also to the third century historian Justin, in his epitome of the Philippic Histories, a work written by the first century BC historian Trogus, Alexander II was a protégé of Ptolemy VIII. (Note: The original Philippic Histories of Trogus consisted of forty four books and is lost. Justin produced a three hundred page epitome of Trogus's forty four books, which was in reality an extract of the original work. It does not seem that Justin added his own material to the epitome, but his book was not an accurate reproduction of the original work. Justin's epitome, a summarised version of the original work and full of omissions, eclipsed Trogus's in popularity and resulted in the latter's disappearance.) The first century historian Josephus wrote the Syrians themselves asked Ptolemy VIII to send them a Seleucid prince as their king, and he chose Alexander II. According to the Prologues of the Philippic Histories, the Egyptian king bribed Alexander II to oppose Demetrius II. (Note: Fragments of Trogus's original history survive in the works of several ancient historians. The Prologues of Trogus are summaries of each of the forty-four books, whose author and date are unknown, that reached the modern era appended to some of the manuscripts containing Justin's epitome of Trogus's original work. It is possible the prologues preserve some of Trogus's original wording.)

== Parentage and name ==
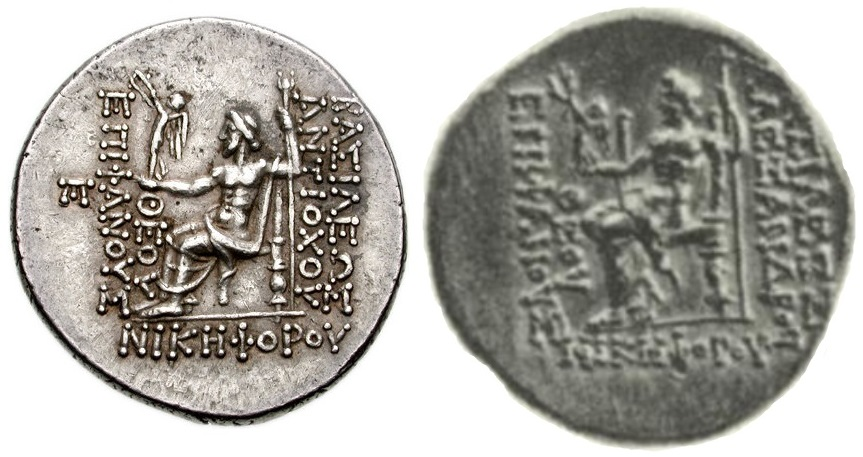
Reverse of a tetradrachm minted by Antiochus IV (left) and the reverse of a gold stater minted by Alexander II (right)

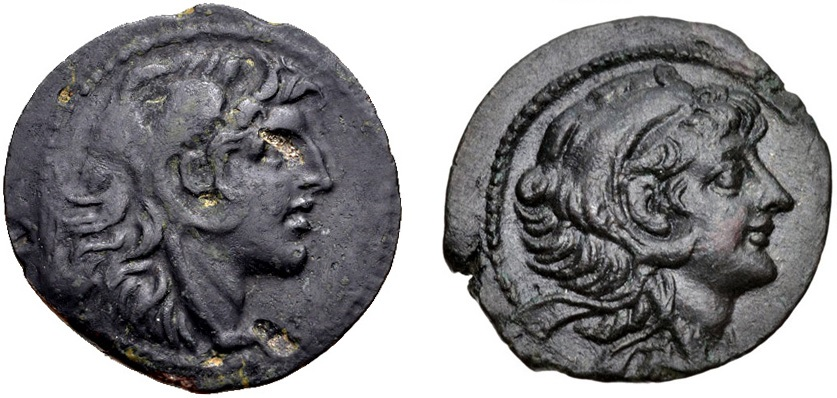
Alexander I (left) and Alexander II (right) wearing the lion scalp

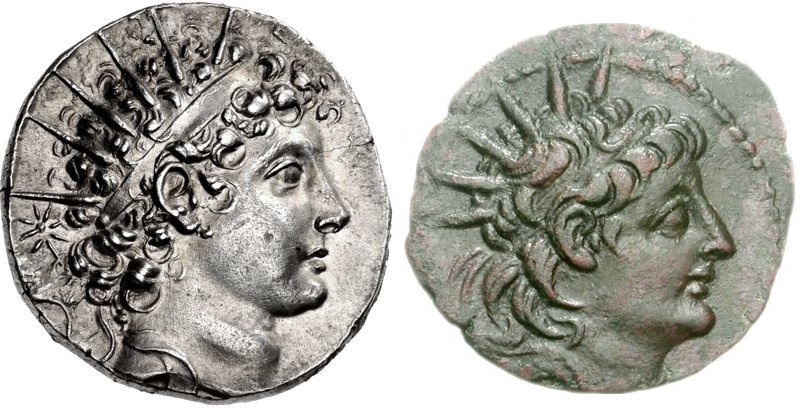
Antiochus VI (left) and Alexander II (right) wearing the radiate crown in the same manner

Alexander II was probably born in c. 150 BC. (Note: Historian Kay Ehling proposed, based on the king's portrait known from his coins, that Alexander II was no more than twenty years old when his reign began in 128 BC. If he was a son of Alexander I, who died in 145 BC, then he could not have been younger than sixteen years old when he ascended the throne.) His name is Greek, meaning "protector of men". According to Justin, Alexander II was the son of an Egyptian trader named Protarchus. Justin also added that "Alexander" was a regnal name bestowed upon the king by the Syrians. Justin further stated that Alexander II produced a fabricated story claiming he was an adopted son of Antiochus VII. Porphyry presented a different account in which Alexander II was claimed to be the son of Alexander I.

Modern historic research prefers the detailed account of Justin regarding Alexander II's claims of paternity and his connection to Antiochus VII. However, a 125 BC series of gold staters minted by Alexander II had his epithets, the same ones used by King Antiochus IV, father of Alexander I, and arranged in the same order they had on Antiochus IV's coins. Zeus carrying a Nike is depicted on the reverse of the stater; the Nike is carrying a wreath which crowns the epithet Epiphanes, an element featured in Antiochus IV's coinage. Many themes of Antiochus IV's line appeared on Alexander II's coinage, such as the god Dionysus which was used by Alexander I in 150 BC, in addition to the lion scalp, another theme in Alexander I's coinage. Furthermore, Alexander II was depicted wearing the radiate crown; six rays protrude from the head and are not attached to the diadem, which is a theme that characterized all portraits of Antiochus VI when depicted wearing the radiate crown. Based on those arguments, the account of Porphyry regarding Alexander II's claim of descent from Alexander I should be preferred to the account of Justin.

=== Surname and legitimacy ===
Popular surnames of Seleucid kings are never found on coins, but are handed down only through ancient literature. The surname of Alexander II has different spellings; it is "Zabinaeus" in the prologue of the Latin language Philippic Histories, book XXXIX. "Zebinas" was used by Josephus. The Greek rendition, Zabinas, was used by many historians such as Diodorus Siculus and Porphyry. Zabinas is a Semitic proper name, derived from the Aramaic verb זבן (pronounced Zabn), which means "buy" or "gain". The meaning of Zabinas as a surname of Alexander II is "a slave sold in the market" according to philologist Pierre Jouguet. This is based on a statement by Porphyry. He wrote that Alexander II was named Zabinas by the Syrians because he was a "bought slave". In the view of archaeologist Jean-Antoine Letronne, who agreed that Alexander II was an imposter, a coin meant for the public could not have had "Zabinas" inscribed on it as it is derisory. (Note: Hubertus Goltzius forged a medal of Alexander II carrying the surname "Zebinas" based on the work of Josephus; this medal was unanimously rejected by numismatists.) On the other hand, historian Philip Khuri Hitti noted that "Zebina", another rendering of Zabinas, occurs in Ezra (10:43), indicating it originally meant "bought from god". The numismatist Nicholas L. Wright also considered that Zabinas meant "purchased from the god".

Though academic consensus considers Alexander II an imposter of non-Seleucid birth, Josephus accepted the king as a Seleucid dynast but did not specify his connection to earlier kings. Historian Kay Ehling ascribed Josephus's acceptance to Alexander II's successful propaganda. Wright, however, contends that Alexander II should be considered a legitimate Seleucid and a descendant of Antiochus IV using the following arguments:

- Porphyry's account of the adoption by Antiochus VII might be based on facts. Justin called Antiochus VI a step-son of Demetrius II. In Wright's view, this association between Antiochus VI and his father's enemy might be an indication that Demetrius II adopted Antiochus VI in an attempt to close the rift in the royal family. Likewise, it is possible Alexander II was indeed a son of Alexander I adopted by Antiochus VII. The second century historian Arrian spoke of an Alexander, the son of Alexander I, who was elevated to kingship by Tryphon in 145 BC; this passage is puzzling as it is numismatically proven that it was Antiochus VI whom Tryphon raised to the throne. According to Wright, the language of Arrian indicates he probably had access to sources mentioning Alexander II as a son of Alexander I.
- Justin's account regarding Protarchos, the alleged Egyptian father of Alexander II, is illogical. Wright suggested Alexander II was an illegitimate son of Alexander I; it is probable Alexander II might have been a younger son of Alexander I destined to become a priest, hence he was called Zabinas—purchased from the god. It is dubious Alexander II was a low-born Egyptian man, whose claims to the throne were based on publicly known falsifications, yet he was accepted by the Syrians as their king. The story about Alexander II's Egyptian origin was probably invented by the court of Demetrius II, maintained by the court of his son Antiochus VIII, and kept alive by ancient historians due to its scandalous nature.

== King of Syria ==
=== Ascending the throne ===
The young Antiochus Epiphanes likely died of an illness. Alexander II, whose earliest coins from the capital are dated to 184 SE (129/128 BC), probably landed in northern Syria with Ptolemaic support and declared himself king, taking Antioch in the process; the fall of the capital probably took place in spring 128 BC. According to Justin's epitome, the Syrians were ready to accept any king other than Demetrius II. Probably soon after capturing Antioch, Alexander II incorporated Laodicea ad mare and Tarsus into his domains. (Note: Ehling suggested that Tarsus came under Alexander II's rule early in his reign. Others, such as the numismatists Arthur Houghton and Oliver Hoover, maintained that the city produced enough coins in the name of Demetrius II to make it plausible that he retained it throughout his reign which ended in 125 BC.) Other cities, such as Apamea, had already freed themselves from Demetrius II during his Egyptian campaign and did not come immediately under Alexander II's authority.

=== Epithets and royal image ===
Hellenistic kings did not use regnal numbers, which is a modern practice; instead, they used epithets to distinguish themselves from similarly named monarchs. The majority of Alexander II's coins did not feature an epithet, but the 125 BC series of gold staters bore the epithets Theos Epiphanes (god manifest) and Nikephoros (bearer of victory). Three bronze issues, one of them minted in Seleucia Pieria, are missing the epithet Theos but retain Epiphanes and Nikephoros. Those epithets, an echo of those of Antiochus IV's, served to emphasise the legitimacy of Alexander II as a Seleucid king.

Alexander the Great (d. 323 BC), founder of the Macedonian Empire, was an important figure in the Hellenistic world; his successors used his legacy to establish their legitimacy. Alexander the Great never had his image minted on his own coins, but his successors, such as the Ptolemaics, sought to associate themselves with him; cities were named after him, and his image appeared on coins. In contrast, the memory of Alexander the Great was not important for Seleucid royal ideology. (Note: The image of Alexander the Great appeared on the coinage of the first Seleucid king Seleucus I, who used his predecessor's memory to legitimise his rule. On the other hand, Seleucus I's successors, starting with his son Antiochus I, dropped Alexander the Great's image from their coinage, and derived their legitimacy from the deified Seleucus I. However, the "Alexander portrait type", based on the image of Alexander created by his immediate successors, was the base for the royal portrait type used by the Seleucid monarchs. The "Alexander portrait type" is characterised by the upward gaze of the king, and an anastolic hair (a cut where the hair arises off-centre from the forehead, allowing it to fall over it, forming a fringe, and the remaining hair falling on the shoulders, forming a mane or crown).) However, Alexander I and Alexander II, both having Egyptian support, were the only Seleucid kings who paid particular attention to Alexander the Great by depicting themselves wearing the lion scalp, a motif closely connected to the Macedonian king. By associating himself with Alexander the Great, Alexander II was continuing the practice of Alexander I, who used the theme of Alexander the Great to strengthen his legitimacy. (Note: Alexander I, in contrast to all previous kings, was probably born out of wedlock to Antiochus IV and a concubine, and he was called a bastard by the second century historian, Appian. Since Antiochus IV was a deified king, Alexander I used the epithet theopator (son of the god), which emphasised his divine descent and paid no attention to his mother whose status was insignificant for a god's son. By using the iconography of Alexander the Great, Alexander I was alluding to the fact that a son of a deity does not need conventional legitimacy, since Alexander the Great was said to be the son of Zeus-Amon instead of his actual father, Philip II.)

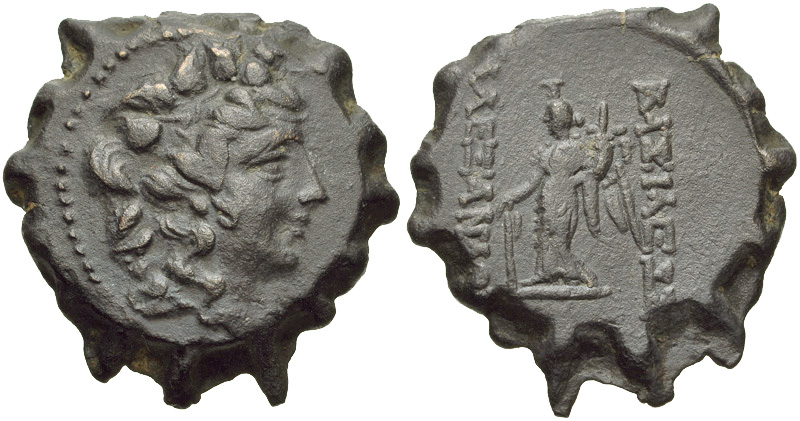
Coin minted by Alexander II depicting Dionysus on its obverse

The native Syro-Phoenician religious complex was based on triads that included a supreme god, a supreme goddess, and their son; the deities taking those roles were diverse. It is possible that by 145 BC Dionysus took the role of the son. The Levant was a multi-ethnic, multi-cultural region, but the religious complex was a unifying force. The Seleucid monarchs understood the possibility of using this complex to expand their support base amongst the locals by integrating themselves into the triads. Usage of the radiate crown, a sign of divinity, by the Seleucid kings, probably carried a message: that the king was the consort of Atargatis, Syria's supreme goddess. (Note: Wright proposed the hypothesis regarding the connection between the Seleucid radiate crowns and Atargatis. He considered it likely, but difficult to prove, that a radiate crown indicates a ritual marriage between the goddess and a king.) The radiate crown was utilised for the first time at an unknown date by Antiochus IV, who chose Hierapolis-Bambyce, the most important sanctuary of Atargatis, to ritually marry Diana, considered a manifestation of the Syrian goddess in the Levant. Alexander I's nickname, Balas, was probably used by the king himself. It is the Greek rendering of Ba'al, the Levant's supreme god. By using such an epithet, Alexander I was declaring himself the embodiment of Ba'al. Alexander I also used the radiate crown to indicate his ritual marriage to the supreme goddess. Alexander II made heavy use of the motifs of Dionysus in his coins. It is possible that, by utilising Dionysus, the son of the supreme god, Alexander II presented himself as the spiritual successor of his god-father, in addition to being his political heir.

=== Policy ===
One of Alexander II's first acts was the burial of Antiochus VII's remains which were returned by the Parthians. Burying the fallen king earned Alexander II the acclaim of Antioch's citizens; (Note: This episode might explain the account of Justin regarding the adoption of Alexander II by Antiochus VII. The historian Thomas Fischer argued that Seleucus, son of Antiochus VII, actually succeeded his father in Antioch following the failed Parthian campaign, then he escaped to Parthia when Demetrius II reached the capital.) it was probably a calculated move aiming at gaining the support of Antiochus VII's loyal men. The seventh century chronicler John of Antioch wrote that following Antiochus VII's death, his son Seleucus ascended the throne and was quickly deposed by Demetrius II and fled to Parthia. Historian Auguste Bouché-Leclercq criticised this account, which is problematic and could be a version of Demetrius II's Parthian captivity corrupted by John of Antioch. However, it is possible that a son of Antiochus VII named Seleucus was captured by the Parthians along with his father and was later sent with Antiochus VII's remains to take the throne of Syria as a Parthian protégé. If this scenario happened, then Seleucus was faced by Alexander II and had to return to Parthia.

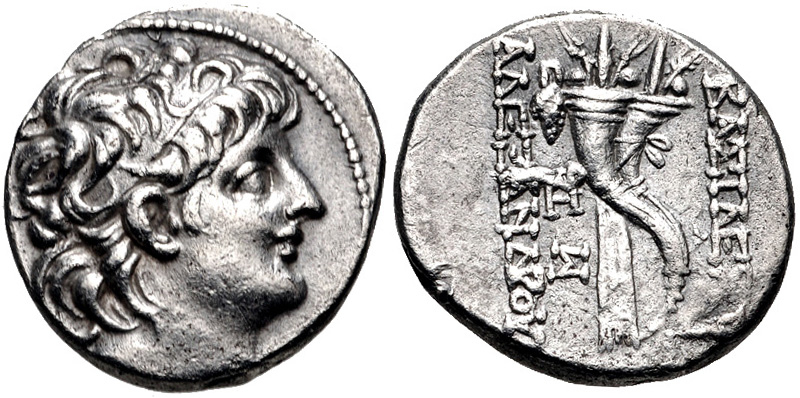
Filleted cornucopiae on a coin of Alexander II

Since he ascended the throne with Egyptian help, Alexander II was under Ptolemaic influence, which was manifested in the appearance of the double-filleted Egyptian-style cornucopiae on the Syrian coinage. (Note: The earliest appearance of cornucopiae in Near Eastern coinage was in Ptolemaic Egypt. Ptolemy II minted coins depicting filleted cornucopiae to commemorate his sister and queen, Arsinoe II, following her death in c. 268 BC. Demetrius I was the first Syrian king to introduce the cornucopia motif in Syrian coinage, but Alexander II was the first Syrian king to use the motif in an Egyptian style. He also introduced his own style depicting symmetrical cornucopiae with intertwined ends.) In Egypt, the double cornucopiae on coins might have been a reference to the union between the king and his consort. If the appearance of cornucopiae on Alexander II's coinage was connected to Ptolemaic practices, then it can be understood that Alexander II might have married a Ptolemaic princess, though such a marriage is not recorded by ancient literature.

According to Diodorus Siculus, Alexander II was "kindly and of a forgiving nature, and moreover was gentle in speech and in manners, wherefore he was deeply beloved by the common people". Diodorus Siculus wrote that three of Alexander II's officers, Antipater, Klonios, and Aeropos, rebelled and entrenched themselves in Laodicea. Alexander II defeated the rebels and recaptured the city; he pardoned the culprits. Bouché-Leclercq suggested that this rebellion took place in 128 BC and that the officers either defected to Demetrius II's side, were working for the son of Antiochus VII, or were instigated in their rebellion by Cleopatra Thea. (Note: The Laodicea meant is most likely Laodicea ad mare, a notion supported by several historians such as Bouché-Leclercq, Getzel M. Cohen and John D Grainger. The historian Edwyn Bevan suggested Laodicea in Phoenicia (modern Beirut), and that the rebellion took place after Demetrius II's death. The historian Adolf Kuhn connected this episode to the fight between Alexander II and Demetrius II's son, Antiochus VIII, thus dating it to 123 BC. Bouché-Leclercq considered Kuhn's suggestion possible, but rejected Bevan's hypothesis.)

=== War against Demetrius II ===
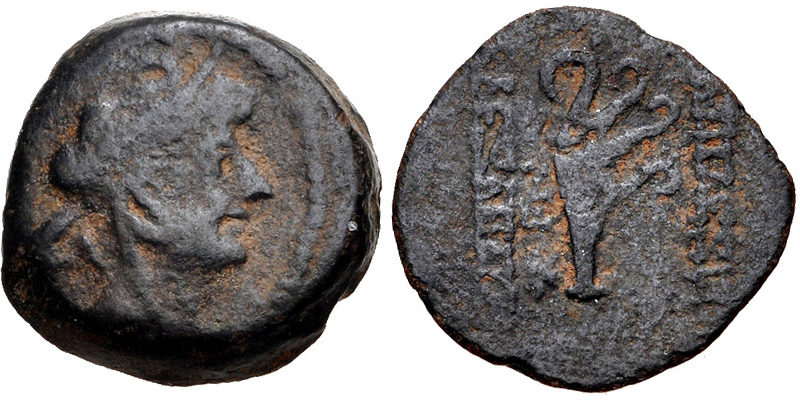
Bronze coin of Alexander II probably struck to celebrate his naval victory over Demetrius II

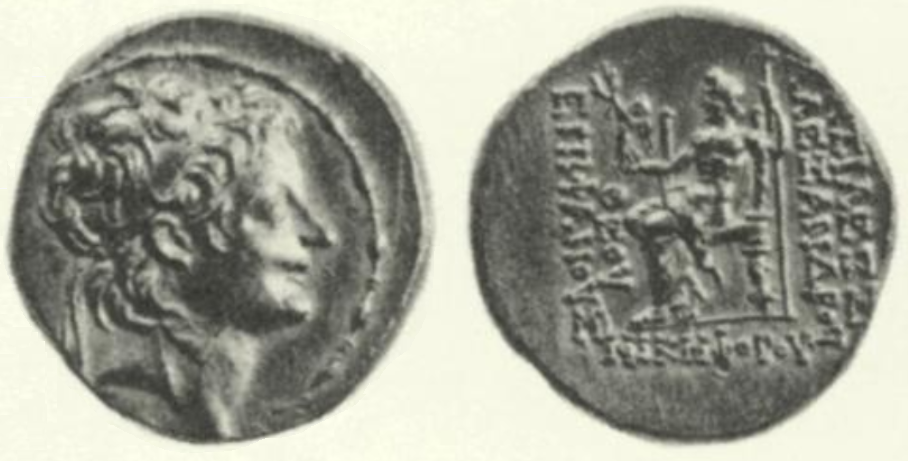
Gold stater minted in 125 BC to celebrate Alexander II's victory over Demetrius II

Between August 127 BC and August 126 BC, Ptolemy VIII regained Alexandria; Cleopatra II fled to Demetrius II with the treasury of Egypt. Despite Alexander II's success in taking the capital, Demetrius II retained Cilicia, and Seleucia Pieria remained loyal to him, so did many cities in Coele-Syria; this led Alexander II to launch a campaign in the region. The armies of the two kings passed through Judea causing a plight for the inhabitants. This led the Jews to send an embassy to Rome demanding "the prohibition of the marching of royal soldiers through the Jewish territory 'and that of their subjects'"; (Note: The Jewish delegation was led by Simon son of Dositheus, Apollonius son of Alexander and Diodorus son of Jason.) the embassy was between c. 127–125 BC. By October 126 BC, Ashkelon fell into Alexander II's hands. Numismatic evidence indicates that Samaria came under Alexander II's control. In the beginning of 125 BC, Demetrius II was defeated near Damascus and fled to Ptolemais. Cleopatra Thea refused to allow her husband to stay in the city, so he headed to Tyre on board a ship. Demetrius II asked for temple asylum in Tyre, but was killed by the city's commander (praefectus) in the spring or summer of 125 BC.

Alexander II minted bronze coins depicting him with an elephant scalp headdress on the obverse, and an aphlaston appears on the reverse; this can mean that Alexander II claimed a naval victory. (Note: The inscription of Antigonus son of Menophilus, a Seleucid admiral (nauarchos), was discovered in the city of Miletus. Antigonus described himself as the "admiral of Alexander, king of Syria"; Alexander II could be the king mentioned. The archaeologist Peter Herrmann considered it possible that Alexander II was the king in question, but maintained that a better candidate would be Alexander I, who was known for his relations with Miletus.) The sea battle between Alexander II and Demetrius II, which is not documented in ancient literature, may have occurred only during the voyage of Demetrius II from Ptolemais to Tyre. The elephant scalp headdress was a theme in Alexander the Great's posthumous coinage minted by his successors. (Note: In Ptolemaic Egypt, Alexander the Great was shown wearing an elephant scalp, a motif not used by the Macedonian king himself. It first appeared on posthumous coins issued by Ptolemy I.) According to Ehling, by appearing with the elephant scalp, Alexander II alluded to Alexander the Great's conquest of Tyre which took place in 332 BC after seven months of siege. (Note: In the view of Hoover, although Alexander II appeared wearing the elephant scalp, Alexander the Great was probably not alluded to. According to Hoover, in a Seleucid context, a king's utilisation of the elephant scalp probably indicated a victory in the East. This view is contested by many scholars, such as Wright, who maintained that Alexander II's usage of the elephant scalp motif was connected to Alexander the Great.) The 125 BC gold staters containing Alexander II's epithets were probably struck to celebrate his victory over Demetrius II. (Note: Alexander II's gold staters did not have any magistrate marks, indicating that they were a special issue and not part of the regular production. Therefore, the gold staters must have been issued under special circumstances.)

=== Relations with Judea ===
Under Antiochus VII, the Judean high-priest and ruler John Hyrcanus I acquired the status of a vassal prince, paying tribute and minting his coinage in the name of the Syrian monarch. Following Antiochus VII's death, John Hyrcanus I ceased paying the tribute and minted coinage bearing his own name, but ties were kept with the Seleucid kingdom through monograms, representing Seleucid kings, that appeared on the early coins. The dating of this event is conjectural, with the earliest date possible 129 BC but more likely 128 BC. Demetrius II apparently planned an invasion of Judea, which was halted due to the king's failed invasion of Egypt and the uprising that erupted in Syria. According to Josephus, John Hyrcanus I "flourished greatly" under Alexander II's rule; apparently, the Judean leader sought an alliance with Alexander II to defend himself against Demetrius II.

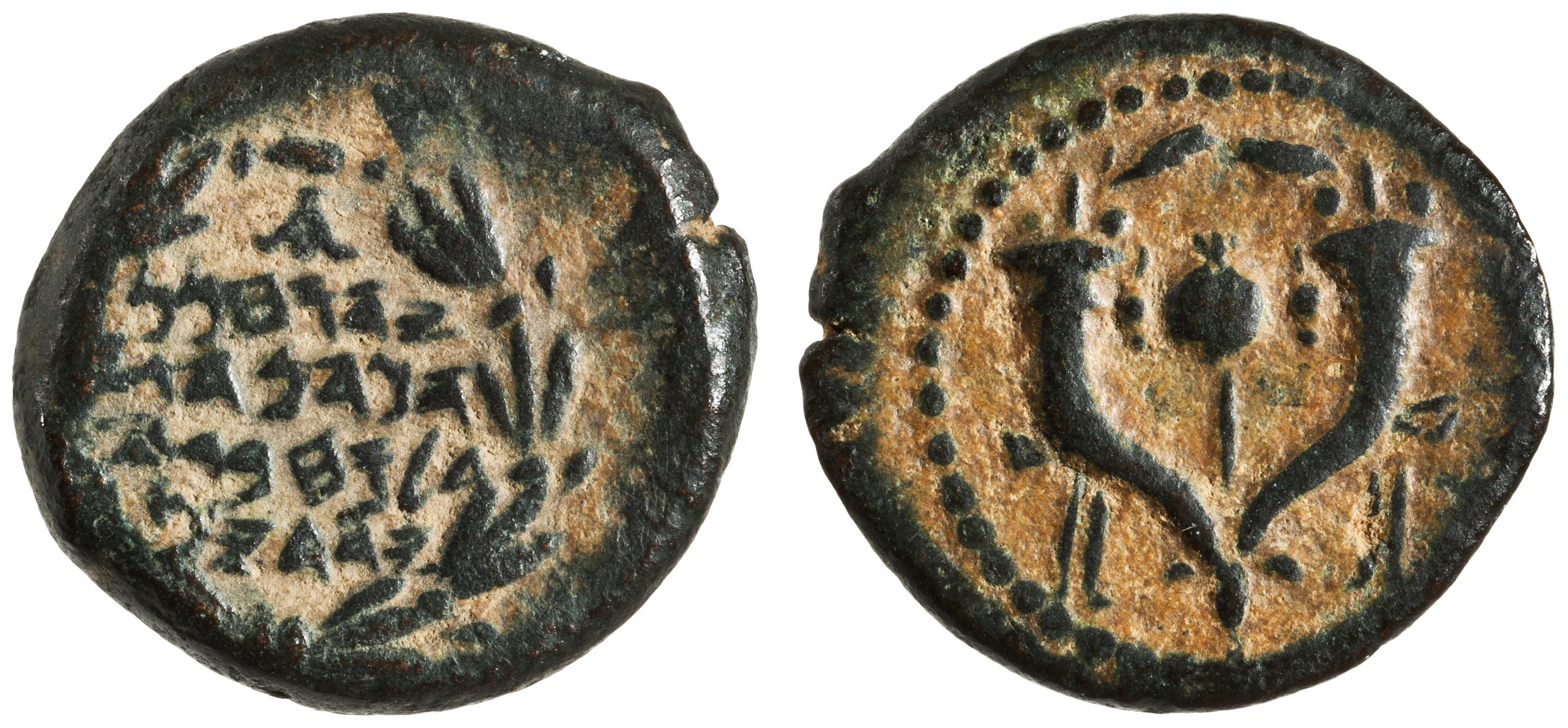
Bronze prutah of John Hyrcanus I. The letter alpha above the Jewish's leader name might represent Alexander II

The 127 BC embassy sent by Judea to Rome asked the senate to force the Syrian abandonment of: Jaffa, the Mediterranean harbours which included Iamnia and Gaza, the cities of Gazara and Pegae (near Kfar Saba), in addition to other territories taken by King Antiochus VII. A Roman senatus consultum (senatorial decree), preserved in Josephus's work Antiquities of the Jews (book XIV, 250), granted the Jews their request regarding the cities, but did not mention the city of Gazara. The senatorial decree mentions the reigning Syrian king as Antiochus son of Antiochus, which can mean only Antiochus IX, who assumed the throne in 199 SE (114/113 BC). The decree might indicate the Syrians had already abandoned Gazara in c. 187 SE (126/125 BC). This supports the notion that an agreement between Alexander II and John Hyrcanus I was signed early in the Syrian king's reign. (Note: Kuhn asserted that the alliance was sealed only after the death of Demetrius II and before the ascension of his successor Antiochus VIII.) Such a treaty would have established the alliance between Alexander II and Judea, and stipulated a territorial agreement where John Hyrcanus I received the lands south of Gazara including that city, while Alexander II maintained control over the region north of Gazara including Samaria.

John Hyrcanus I recognised Alexander II as his sovereign. (Note: John Hyrcanus I was virtually independent and his gestures towards Alexander II were just a facade.) The earliest series of coins minted by the high priest showed the Greek letter Α (alpha) positioned prominently above John Hyrcanus I's name. The alpha must have been the first letter of a Seleucid king's name, and many scholars, such as Dan Barag, suggested that it represents Alexander II. (Note: French numismatist Louis Félicien de Saulcy suggested in 1854 that the alpha represented the initial letter of the name of either Antiochus VII or Alexander II. Numismatists Dan Barag and Shraga Qedar suggested Alexander II or Antiochus VIII instead. Historian Baruch Kanael considered it implausible that the alpha designated a king, since no Seleucid king is known to have settled for the appearance of his initials instead of his full name on the coins of vassal states. Some scholars attribute the alpha series coins to John Hyrcanus II, and many interpretations were offered to explain the letter. For example, the numismatist Arie Kindler suggested that it might represent Salome Alexandra, mother of John Hyrcanus II, or, in the view of the numismatist Ya'akov Meshorer, might be a reference for Antipater the Idumaean, John Hyrcanus II's advisor and the power behind the throne.) Another clue indicating the relationship between Alexander II and John Hyrcanus I is the latter's use of the double cornucopiae motif on his coins; a pomegranate motif appeared in the centre of the cornucopiae to highlight the authority of the Jewish leader. This imagery was apparently a cautious policy by John Hyrcanus I. In case Alexander II was defeated, the Judean coins motifs were neutral enough to appease an eventual successor, while if Alexander II emerged victorious and decided to interfere in Judea, the cornucopiae coins could be used to show the king that John Hyrcanus I already accepted Alexander II's suzerainty. The high priest eventually won the independence of Judea later in Alexander II's reign; once John Hyrcanus I severed his ties with the Seleucids, the alpha was removed.

=== Height of power and the break with Egypt ===
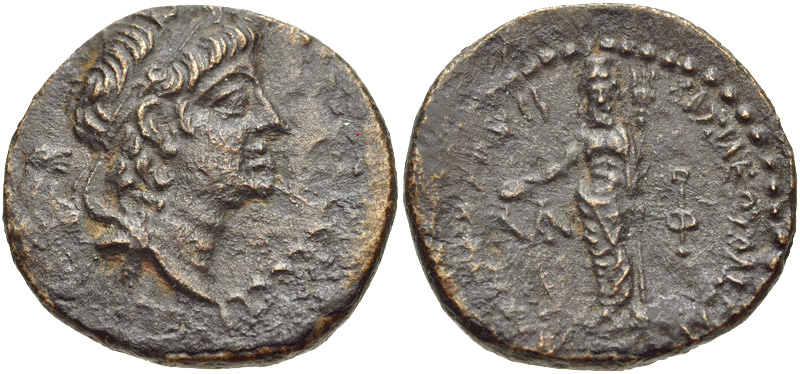
Bronze coin of Alexander II, minted in Beirut

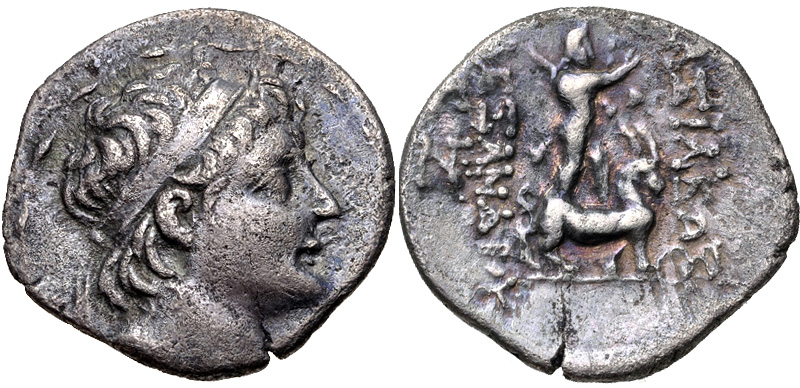
Drachm of Alexander II, minted in Tarsus

Following Demetrius II's death, Alexander II, commanding a force of forty thousand soldiers, brought Seleucia Pieria under his control. Cilicia was also conquered in 125 BC along with other regions. The coinage of Alexander II was minted in: Antioch, Seleucia Pieria, Apamea, Damascus, Beirut, Ashkelon and Tarsus, in addition to unknown minting centers in northern Syria, southern Coele-Syria and Cilicia (coded by numismatists: uncertain mint 111, 112, 113, 114). In Ptolemais, Cleopatra Thea refused to recognise Alexander II as king; already in 187 SE (126/125 BC), the year of her husband's defeat, she struck tetradrachms in her own name as the sole monarch of Syria. Her son with Demetrius II, Seleucus V, declared himself king, but she had him assassinated. The people of Syria did not accept a woman as the sole monarch. This led Cleopatra Thea to choose her younger son by Demetrius II, Antiochus VIII, as a co-ruler in 186 SE (125/124 BC).

According to Justin, Ptolemy VIII abandoned Alexander II after the death of Demetrius II and reconciled with Cleopatra II who went back to Egypt as a co-ruler. Justin stated that Ptolemy VIII's reason for abandoning Alexander II was the latter's increased arrogance swelled by his successes that led him to treat his benefactor with insolence. The change of Ptolemaic policy probably had less to do with Ptolemy VIII's pride than with Alexander II's victories; a strong neighbour in Syria was not a desired situation for Egypt. It is also probable that Cleopatra Thea negotiated an alliance with her uncle. Soon after Cleopatra II's return, Ptolemy VIII's daughter by Cleopatra III, Tryphaena, was married to Antiochus VIII. An Egyptian army was sent to support the faction of Antiochus VIII against Alexander II. (Note: The treaty between Cleopatra Thea and Ptolemy VIII is not mentioned in ancient sources, but several historians, such as Alfred Bellinger and John Whitehorne, consider its existence likely. The installation of Antiochus VIII on his throne might also have been part of the deal; given the fact that Cleopatra Thea killed her eldest son to remain a sole monarch, her acceptance of sharing her power with Antiochus VIII can be understood if it was part of a deal she struck under the pressure of Alexander II's victories. According to Bouché-Leclercq, it was Cleopatra II who probably pushed for Egypt's abandonment of Alexander II, and the establishment of the alliance between Ptolemy VIII and Antiochus VIII, which included the dynastic marriage of the Syrian king and Tryphaena.) The return of Cleopatra II and the marriage of Antiochus VIII both took place in 124 BC.

=== War with Antiochus VIII, defeat and death ===
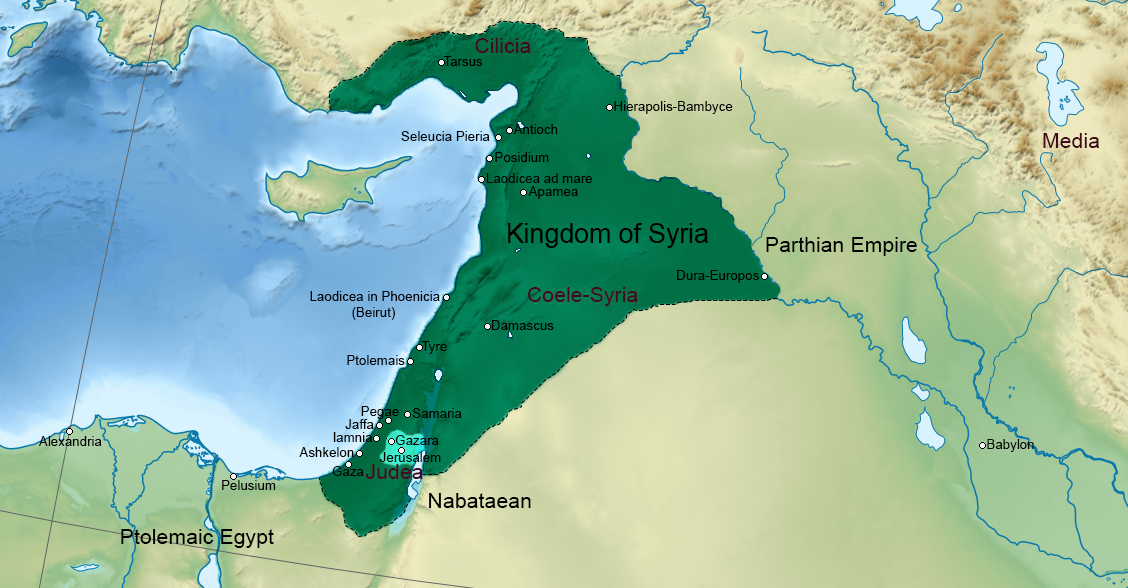
Syria in early 124 BC; Alexander II was in control of the country with the exception of the city of Ptolemais

Supported by the Egyptian troops, Antiochus VIII waged war against Alexander II, who lost most of his lands. He lost Ashkelon in 189 SE (124/123 BC). The final battle took place at an unknown location in the first half of 123 BC, ending with Alexander II's defeat. Different ancient historians presented varying accounts of Alexander II's end. Josephus merely stated that the king was defeated and killed, while Eusebius mentioned that Alexander II committed suicide with poison because he could not live with his defeat. Most details are found in the accounts of Diodorus Siculus and Justin:

- In the account of Diodorus Siculus, Alexander II decided to avoid the battle with Antiochus VIII since he had no confidence in his subjects' aspirations for political change or their tolerance for the hardships that warfare would bring. Instead of fighting, Alexander II decided to take the royal treasuries, steal the valuables of the temples, and sail to Greece at night. While pillaging the temple of Zeus with some of his foreign subordinates, he was discovered by the populace and barely escaped with his life. Accompanied by a few men he went to Seleucia Pieria, but the news of his sacrilege arrived before him. The city closed its gates, forcing him to seek shelter in Posidium. Two days after pillaging the temple, Alexander II was caught and brought in chains to Antiochus VIII in his camp, suffering the insults and humiliation at the hands of his enemies. People who witnessed the indignation of Alexander II were shocked at the scene they thought could never happen. After accepting what had occurred in front of them was reality, they looked away with astonishment.
- In the account of Justin, Alexander II fled to Antioch following his defeat at the hands of Antiochus VIII. Lacking the resources to pay his troops, the king ordered the removal of a golden Nike from the temple of Jupiter (Zeus), joking that "victory was lent to him by Jupiter". A few days later, Alexander II himself ordered the golden statue of Jupiter to be taken out under the cover of night. The city's populace revolted against the king, and he was forced to flee. He was later deserted by his men and caught by bandits; they delivered him to Antiochus VIII, who ordered him executed.

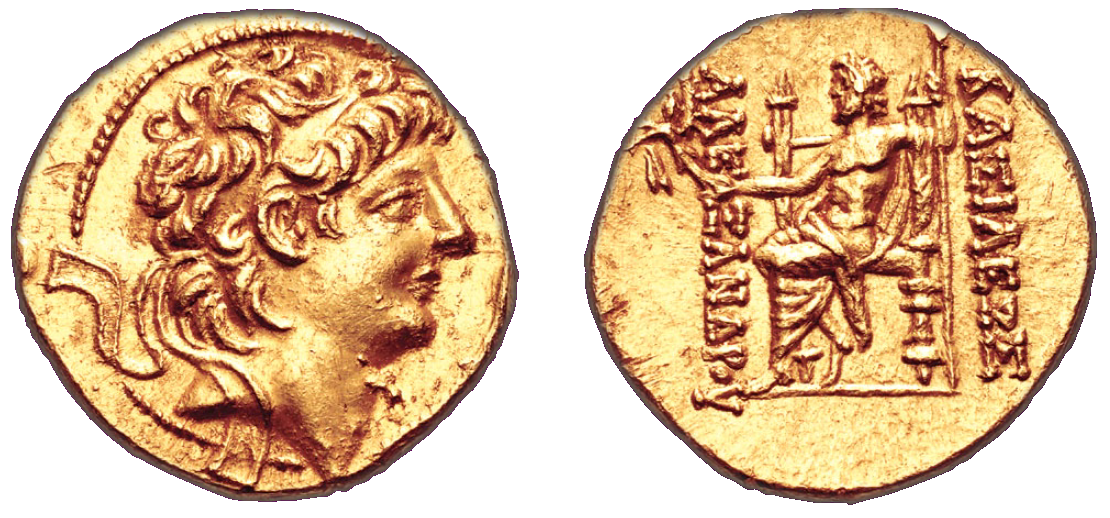
The golden stater probably minted using the spoils from Zeus' temple

Alexander II issued two series of gold staters. One bears his epithets and dates to 125 BC according to many numismatists, such as Oliver Hoover and Arthur Houghton, and another bearing only the title of king (basileus). Earlier numismatists, such as Edward Theodore Newell and Ernest Babelon, who only knew about the 125 BC stater, suggested that it was minted with the gold pillaged from the temple. However, the iconography of that stater does not match that used for Alexander II's late coinage, as the diadem ties fall in a straight fashion on the neck. On the other hand, the arrangement of the diadem ties on the stater that lacks the royal epithets is more consistent with Alexander II's late tetradrachm, making it more reasonable to associate that stater with the Nike theft. (Note: The association of the gold stater with the sacrilege act can be accepted only if the account of Justin is preferred to that of Diodorus Siculus, as he stated that Alexander II was caught only two days after pillaging the temple, giving the king no time to mint currency.)

Though his last coins were issued in 190 SE (123/122 BC), ancient historians do not provide the explicit date of Alexander II's death. He probably died by October 123 BC since the first Antiochene coins of Antiochus VIII were issued in 190 SE (123/122 BC). Damascus kept striking coinage in the name of Alexander II until 191 SE (122/121 BC), when the forces of Antiochus VIII took it. According to Diodorus Siculus, many who witnessed the king's end "remarked in various ways on the fickleness of fate, the reversals in human fortunes, the sudden turns of tide, and how changeable life could be, far beyond what anyone would expect". No wife or children of Alexander II, if he had any, are known; with his death, the line of Antiochus IV became extinct.

== See also ==
- List of Syrian monarchs
- Timeline of Syrian history

== Notes ==
Alexander II Zabinas Seleucid dynasty Born: 150 BC Died: 123 BC
Preceded by Demetrius II	King of Syria; 128–123 BC with Demetrius II (128–125 BC); Cleopatra Thea (125–123 BC); Seleucus V (125 BC); Antiochus VIII (125–123 BC)	Succeeded by Cleopatra Thea; Antiochus VIII
