= Seleucus V Philometor =

King of the Seleucid Empire from 126 to 125 BC

- Crown Prince and King of Syria

Co-regent (King) of the Seleucid Empire
- Reign: 126–125 BC (with his mother Cleopatra Thea)
- Coronation: 125 BC
- Predecessor: Demetrius II Nicator and Alexander II Zabinas
- Successor: Cleopatra Thea and Antiochus VIII Grypus
- Born: Unknown
- Died: 125 BC
- Dynasty: Seleucid
- Father: Demetrius II Nicator
- Mother: Cleopatra Thea

The Seleucid king Seleucus V Philometor (Greek: Σέλευκος Ε΄ ὁ Φιλομήτωρ; 126/125 BC), ruler of the Hellenistic Seleucid kingdom, was the eldest son of Demetrius II Nicator and Cleopatra Thea. The epithet Philometor means "mother-loving" and in the Hellenistic world usually indicated that the mother acted as co-regent for the prince.

== Biography ==
Just before Antiochus VII Sidetes died fighting the Parthian Empire in late 129, the Parthian king Phraates II had released Demetrius II, who entered Syria in ca. September 129. This forced Seleucus V's half-brother Antiochus IX to flee to Cyzicus. Cleopatra Thea remarried Demetrius and reunited him with his two sons, Seleucus V and Antiochus VIII.

The Parthians captured Antiochus VII's son, also named Seleucus, and Laodice, Seleucus V's sister, who had accompanied the fallen king on campaign. Phraates married Laodice, and showed great favor to Seleucus, son of Antiochus VII. While Demetrius II was preoccupied fighting the usurper Alexander II Zabinas, the Parthians sent this Seleucus back to Syria, hoping he could take the throne as their puppet king. The attempt failed, and he spent the rest of his life in Parthia.

Instead, after his father was murdered outside of Tyre in 125, Seleucus V claimed the throne as the eldest son of Demetrius II; however, he was soon killed by his own mother. According to Appian, Cleopatra Thea had aided in the death of Demetrius and feared that Seleucus V might avenge his father. This encouraged her to remove Seleucus in favor of his younger brother, Antiochus VIII.

== See also ==
- List of Syrian monarchs
- Timeline of Syrian history

Preceded by Demetrius II Nicator	Seleucid King with Cleopatra Thea; 126–125 BC	Succeeded by Antiochus VIII Grypus and Cleopatra Thea
