= Antiochus II of Commagene =

1st-century BC prince

Antiochus II (Greek: Ἀντίοχος, flourished 1st century BC) was a man of Iranian and Greek descent. Antiochus II was a prince from the Kingdom of Commagene and the second son of King Antiochus I Theos of Commagene. He was the youngest brother of prince and future king Mithridates II of Commagene.

Very little is known of Antiochus II. In 29 BC, he was summoned to Rome by the Emperor Augustus for causing the assassination of an ambassador Mithridates II had sent to Rome. Antiochus II was subsequently executed on Augustus’ orders.

== Sources ==
- Widengren, G. (1986). "Antiochus of Commagene". Encyclopaedia Iranica, Vol. II, Fasc. 2. pp. 135–136.
- Merz, Annette; Tieleman, Teun L (2012). The Letter of Mara bar Sarapion in Context: Proceedings of the Symposium Held at Utrecht University, 10-12 December 2009. Leiden: Brill. ISBN 9789004233010.
- Babaie, Sussan; Grigor, Talinn (2015). Persian Kingship and Architecture: Strategies of Power in Iran from the Achaemenids to the Pahlavis. I.B.Tauris. pp. 1–288. ISBN 9780857734778.
- Erskine, Andrew; Llewellyn-Jones, Lloyd; Wallace, Shane (2017). The Hellenistic Court: Monarchic Power and Elite Society from Alexander to Cleopatra. The Classical Press of Wales. ISBN 978-1910589625.
- Garsoian, Nina (2005). "Tigran II". Encyclopaedia Iranica.
- Marciak, Michał (2017). Sophene, Gordyene, and Adiabene: Three Regna Minora of Northern Mesopotamia Between East and West. BRILL. ISBN 9789004350724.
- Sartre, Maurice (2005). The Middle East Under Rome. Harvard University Press. ISBN 9780674016835.
