= Cleopatra Thea =

Queen of the Seleucid Empire from 126 to 121 BC

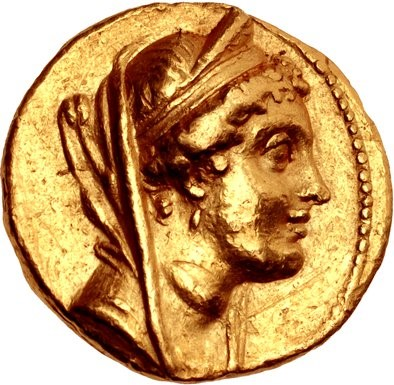
- Gold coin of Cleopatra, Ake mint

Queen regnant of Syria
- Tenure: 126–121 BC
- Coronation: 126 BC
- Predecessors: Demetrius II, Alexander II
- Successor: Antiochus VIII
- Co-rulers: Seleucus V (126–125 BC); Antiochus VIII (125–121 BC)
- Contender: Alexander II (126–123 BC)

Queen consort of Syria
- Tenure: 150 BC–126 BC
- Coronation: 150 BC
- Born: c. 164 BC; Egypt
- Died: 121 BC
- Spouses: Alexander I; Demetrius II; Antiochus VII
- Issue: Antiochus VI; Seleucus V; Antiochus VIII; Antiochus IX (Note: Other children with Antiochus VII besides Antiochus IX may include another son named Antiochus, a son named Seleucus and one or two daughters named Laodice.)
- Dynasty: Ptolemaic
- Father: Ptolemy VI
- Mother: Cleopatra II

Cleopatra I or Cleopatra Thea (Koine Greek: Κλεοπάτρα Θεά, which means "Cleopatra the Goddess"; c. 164 – 121 BC), surnamed Eueteria (εὐετηρῐ́ᾱ lit. 'good-harvest/fruitful season') was a ruler of the Hellenistic Seleucid Empire. She was queen consort of Syria from 150 to about 125 BC as the wife of three Kings of Syria: Alexander Balas, Demetrius II Nicator, and Antiochus VII Sidetes. She ruled Syria from 125 BC after the death of Demetrius II Nicator, eventually in co-regency with her son Antiochus VIII Grypus until 121 or 120 BC.

== Biography ==
=== Childhood ===
Cleopatra Thea was born, probably ca. 164 BC, to Ptolemy VI and Cleopatra II, and grew up in Egypt. She may have been engaged to her uncle Ptolemy VIII, king of Cyrene, in 154, but he eventually married her sister Cleopatra III.

=== Queen of Alexander Balas ===
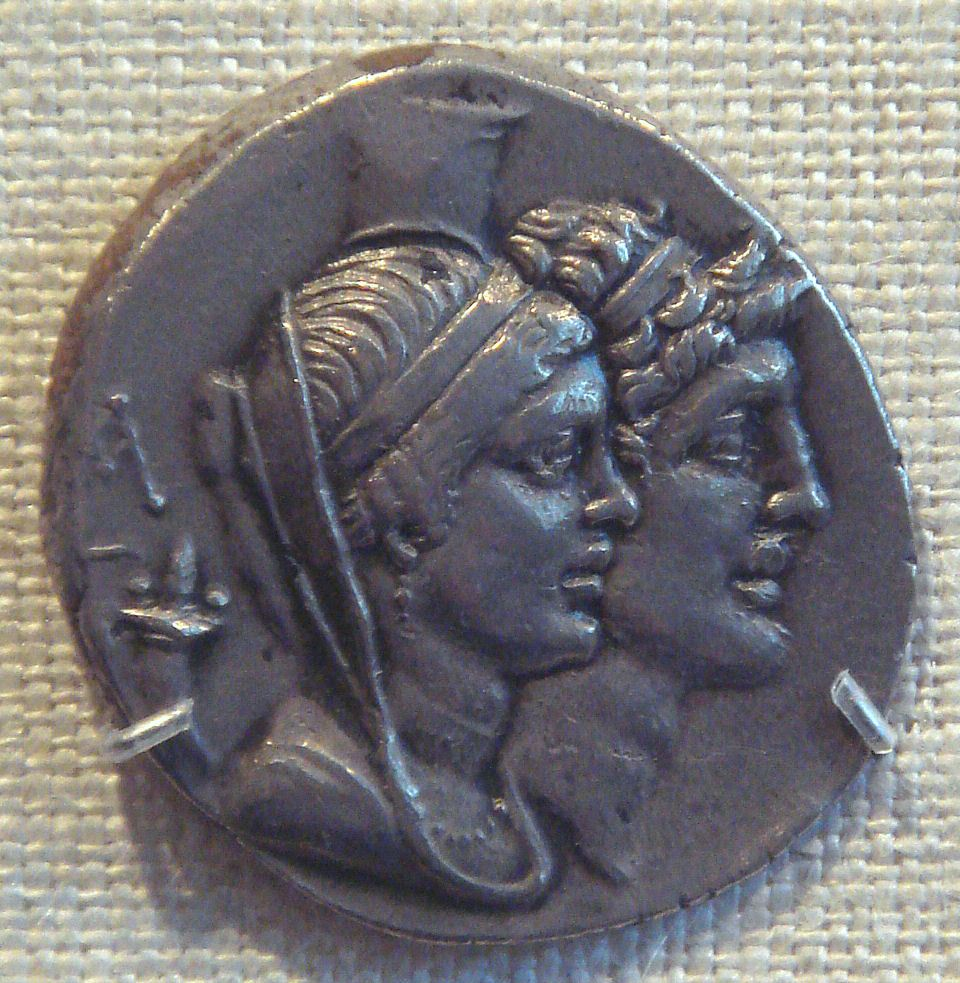
Alexander Balas and Cleopatra Thea

In 152 BC, her father, who had come into conflict with the Seleucid king Demetrius I Soter, chose to promote Antiochus IV's son Alexander Balas against him and supported him with troops and officers. When Alexander triumphed over Demetrius in 150 BC, he requested Ptolemy's daughter as a warranty of alliance. The two kings met, amid sumptuous ceremonies, in Ptolemais Akko, and Alexander received Cleopatra in marriage. The marriage soon produced a son named Antiochus Dionysus.

=== Queen of Demetrius II ===
In 147 BC, Demetrius Soter's son Demetrius II invaded Cilicia. Two years later Ptolemy VI brought his army into Syria, ostensibly to help Alexander Balas fight the invaders. Having installed garrisons in the Seleucid coastal cities, he eventually betrayed Alexander outright by seizing Antioch. There he reunited with Cleopatra. In accordance with her father's new political program, she divorced Alexander and married Demetrius II instead. The marriage deal stated that Ptolemy would help Demetrius take the throne from Alexander; in exchange, Egypt would receive the province of Coele-Syria, which had been Seleucid territory since Antiochus III took it from Ptolemy V in 200 BC. Alexander quelled the Cilician revolt and returned home, confronting Ptolemy and Demetrius in the plain of the river Oeneparas, close to Antioch. In the ensuing battle, Alexander was defeated and Ptolemy was wounded so badly that he died a few days later. Demetrius repudiated his alliance with Egypt and expelled or massacred all of Ptolemy's garrisons in Syria as far as Gaza, reinstating a fragile Seleucid control over the province. The Syrians had hostile memories of his father, and he faced rebellions in Antioch as soon as 144 BC. Demetrius instituted purges, but these aggravated the discontent instead of stifling it.

Diodotus, a former general of Alexander and probable participant in the Antiochene rebellion, abducted Cleopatra's first son Antiochus VI and used him as a figurehead for a secessionist kingdom in Coele-Syria. In 142/1 BC, Diodotus murdered the boy and proclaimed himself as king. During these years of brutal civil war, Cleopatra and Demetrius had at least three children, Seleucus, Antiochus and a daughter called Laodike.

=== Queen of Antiochus VII ===
In 139 BC, Demetrius II was captured in battle against the kingdom of Parthia, which held him prisoner until 129 BC. Diodotus took the opportunity to conquer all of the Seleucid kingdom except the city of Seleucia in Pieria, where Cleopatra sought refuge. She sent for Demetrius's younger brother, Antiochus VII Sidetes, proposing that he should marry her and become the new king. Accepting the offer, Antiochus VII defeated and killed Diodotus in 138 BC, ending the civil wars which had been ongoing since 152. Cleopatra Thea had at least one son with the king, Antiochus IX Cyzicenus. The names of any other children are uncertain.

During his reign, Cleopatra's third husband reestablished Seleucid authority in the kingdom west of the Euphrates. Between 134 and 130 BC he waged a war to reclaim all the satrapies his predecessors had lost to the Parthians. The Parthian king Phraates II decided to release Demetrius II, who had been married to his sister Rhodogune, and to send him to Syria, thus provoking a civil war between the brothers and compelling Antiochus VII to retreat. In the winter of 130/129 Phraates killed Antiochus in an ambush near Ectabane, but Demetrius managed to enter his kingdom before the Parthians could retrieve him.

Cleopatra received Demetrius peaceably, but took the precaution of sending Antiochus IX (her son by Antiochus VII) to Cyzicus, out of the king's immediate reach; she was said to be secretly furious at Demetrius taking a Parthian wife and having children with her. In 128 BC, Demetrius took an army to Egypt to help Cleopatra's mother, Cleopatra II, with her ongoing struggle against her brother and husband Ptolemy VIII Physcon. He was forced to retreat near Pelousion because his soldiers refused to obey him, and Cleopatra Thea, then in Antioch, rebelled against him and established her son Antiochus as king. In the same year, Antioch was occupied by Alexander II Zabinas, a false child of Alexander Balas sent with troops by Ptolemy to wage war against Demetrius in Syria. Cleopatra Thea fled the city, and probably went to Ptolemais, where she had married Alexander Balas some twenty years earlier.

During the period between 128 and 125, while Demetrius was fighting against Alexander, Cleopatra remained in Ptolemais, probably with her two sons by Demetrius, Seleucus and Antiochus. In 125 Demetrius was completely defeated near Damascus by Alexander and his Egyptian allies, and also fled to Ptolemais. Cleopatra refused to admit him to the city; he went instead to Tyre, where the local Seleucid administrator killed him on Cleopatra's orders.

=== Co-ruler of Antiochus VIII ===
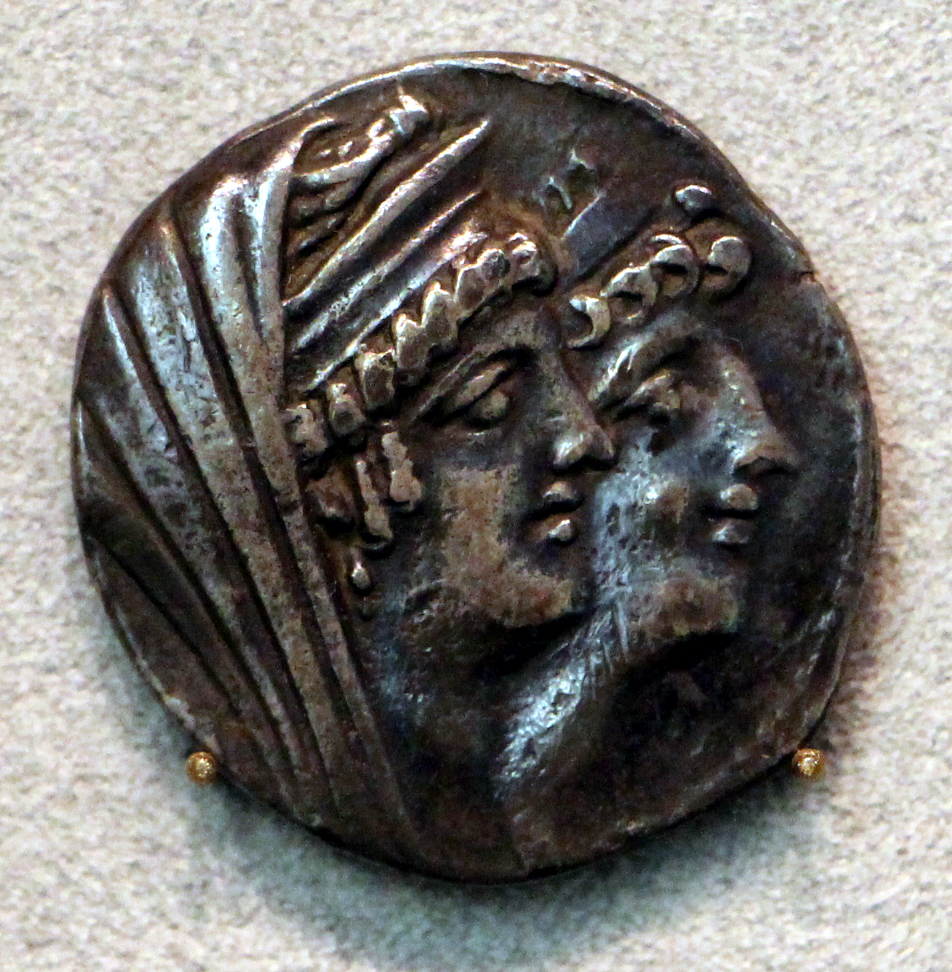
Coin of Cleopatra Thea and Antiochus VIII

Demetrius' elder son, Seleucus, proclaimed himself the new king with the name Seleucus V, but Cleopatra Thea had him executed by archers soon after. From 125 BC to 121 BC Cleopatra ruled Syria, sharing the throne with her son, Antiochus VIII Grypus, whom she had proclaimed king in Antioch in 128 BC. Antiochus VIII was married to Tryphaena, the daughter of Ptolemy VIII Physcon and Cleopatra III. Cleopatra Thea thus procured an Egyptian alliance, causing Ptolemy to turn against Alexander II (whom he had previously supported as a means of keeping the Seleucids preoccupied with civil war). By 123 BC Alexander II had been defeated and executed, Cleopatra and Grypus remaining joint rulers in Cilicia, Syria and Northern Mesopotamia.

Grypus became less controllable as he grew up, and in 121 BC Cleopatra Thea decided to eliminate him. She offered him a cup of poisoned wine, but Grypus guessed her intention and forced her to drink the wine, which killed her. Grypus's sole reign was peaceful until ca. 114 BC, when Cleopatra Thea's other son, Antiochus IX, returned to Syria to claim the throne and civil war started again.

== Family ==
Cleopatra Thea was a daughter of Ptolemy VI Philometor and Cleopatra II of Egypt. She had two brothers named Ptolemy Eupator and Ptolemy respectively. Her sister Cleopatra III was Queen of Egypt and married to Ptolemy VIII, an uncle, who had been a former co-ruler of Cleopatra Thea's parents. It is possible that Berenice, the fiancée of Attalus III, king of Pergamum, is another sister.

Cleopatra Thea married three times:

- Alexander Balas in about 150 BC. This union produced Antiochus VI Dionysus. Alexander Balas was neither popular, nor an efficient ruler. The marriage was dissolved by her father. Alexander Balas died in battle against Demetrius II of Syria in 145 BC.
- Demetrius II Nicator in 145 BC. Demetrius became a captive of the Parthians from 139 to 129 BC. He was assassinated in Tyre in 125 BC on Cleopatra Thea's orders. Demetrius and Cleopatra Thea had at least two sons–Seleucus V Philometor, who was killed by his mother for taking the crown without her permission; and Antiochus VIII Grypus, who eventually killed his mother in turn. They also had a daughter Laodice, whom Phraates II of Parthia captured and later married for her beauty.
- Antiochus VII Sidetes, Demetrius' younger brother, in 137 BC after Demetrius was captured by the Parthians. Cleopatra and Antiochus VII had at least one son: Antiochus IX Cyzicenus. They also likely had two other sons named Antiochus and Seleucus and one or two daughters named Laodice.

== See also ==
- List of Syrian monarchs
- Timeline of Syrian history

== Notes ==
Cleopatra Thea Ptolemaic Dynasty Born: c. 164 BC Died: 121 BC
Preceded by Laodice V or Apama	Seleucid Queen (Queen Consort of Syria); 150–126 BC with Alexander Balas (150–145 BC); Demetrius II Nicator (145–139 BC, 129–126 BC); Antiochus VII Sidetes (138–129 BC)	Succeeded by Tryphaena and Cleopatra IV
Preceded by Demetrius II Nicator	Seleucid Queen (Queen Regnant of Syria); 125–121 BC with Seleucus V Philometor (126-125 BC); Antiochus VIII Grypus (126–121 BC)	Succeeded by Antiochus VIII Grypus
