= Mithridates I Callinicus =

King of Commagene from 109 to 70 BC

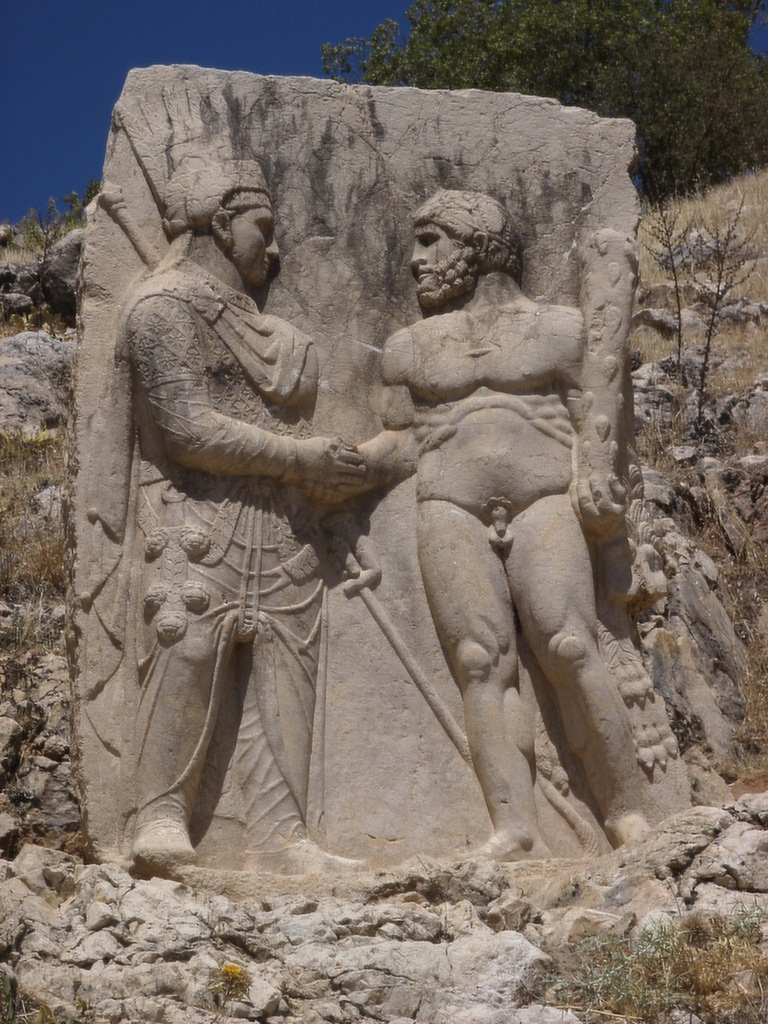
- Mithridates I or his son (left) shaking hands with Herakles-Artagnes-Ares (at Arsameia)

King of Commagene
- Reign: 109–70 BC
- Predecessor: Sames II Theosebes Dikaios
- Successor: Antiochus I Theos of Commagene
- Died: 70 BC
- Spouse: Laodice VII Thea
- Issue: Antiochus I Theos of Commagene
- Dynasty: Orontid dynasty
- Father: Sames II Theosebes Dikaios

Mithridates I Callinicus (Greek: Μιθριδάτης ὀ Кαλλίνικος) was a king of Orontid Iranian descent who lived during the late 2nd century BC and early 1st century BC. Mithridates was a prince, the son, and successor of King of Commagene, Sames II Theosebes Dikaios. Before his succession in 109 BC, he married the Syrian Greek Princess Laodice VII Thea, daughter of King Antiochus VIII Grypus and Ptolemaic princess Tryphaena, as a part of a peace alliance. Mithridates embraced Greek culture. Laodice bore Mithridates a son, Antiochus I Theos of Commagene (c. 86 BC–38 BC), a prince and future king of Commagene. Mithridates died in 70 BC and Antiochus succeeded him.

== See also ==
- List of rulers of Commagene
- Mount Nemrut

== Sources ==
- Babaie, Sussan; Grigor, Talinn (2015). Persian Kingship and Architecture: Strategies of Power in Iran from the Achaemenids to the Pahlavis. I.B.Tauris. pp. 1–288. ISBN 9780857734778.
- Erskine, Andrew; Llewellyn-Jones, Lloyd; Wallace, Shane (2017). The Hellenistic Court: Monarchic Power and Elite Society from Alexander to Cleopatra. The Classical Press of Wales. ISBN 978-1910589625.
- Garsoian, Nina (2005). "Tigran II". Encyclopaedia Iranica.
- Marciak, Michał (2017). Sophene, Gordyene, and Adiabene: Three Regna Minora of Northern Mesopotamia Between East and West. BRILL. ISBN 9789004350724.
- Sartre, Maurice (2005). The Middle East Under Rome. Harvard University Press. ISBN 9780674016835.

Preceded by Sames II Theosebes Dikaios	King of Commagene; 109 BC – ca. 70 BC	Succeeded by Antiochus I Theos of Commagene
