= Mithridates II of Commagene =

King of Commagene from 31 to 20 BC

Mithridates II
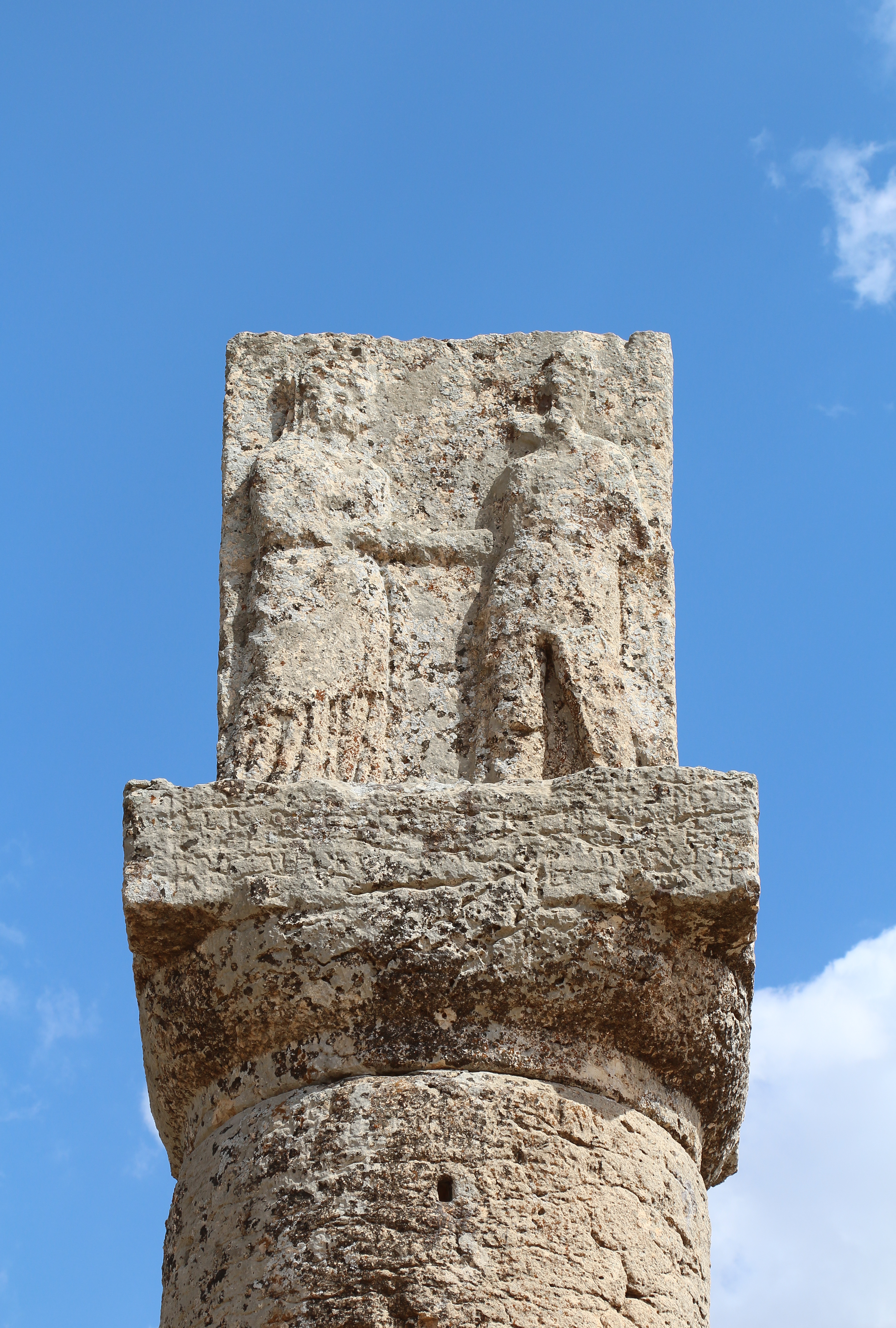
- Relief of Mithridates II and his sister Laodice at the Tumulus of Karakuş, Turkey

King of Commagene
- Reign: 31 BC – 20 BC (9 years)
- Predecessor: Antiochus I Theos
- Successor: Mithridates III
- Died: 20 BC; Rome, Roman Empire
- Issue: Mithridates III of Commagene
Names
- Mithridates II Antiochus Epiphanes Philorhomaeus Philhellen Monocrites
- House: Orontid dynasty
- Father: King Antiochus I Theos of Commagene
- Mother: Isias

Mithridates II Antiochus Epiphanes Philorhomaeus Philhellen Monocrites (Greek: Μιθριδάτης Ἀντίοχος ὀ Ἐπιφανής Φιλορωμαίος Φιλέλλην Μονοκρίτης, died 20 BC), also known as Mithridates II of Commagene, was a king of Commagene in the 1st century BC.

Of Iranian and Greek descent, he was one of the sons of King Antiochus I Theos of Commagene. When his father died in c. 31 BC, he succeeded his father and reigned until his death.

== Biography ==
According to Plutarch, Mithridates was an ally of the Roman triumvir Mark Antony. In 31 BC, Mithridates personally led his forces to Actium in Greece in support of Antony in the war against Caesar Octavian, the future Roman emperor Augustus. After the defeat of Antony, however, Mithridates became a loyal ally to Augustus. Nevertheless, Augustus forced Mithridates to hand over a village in Commagene called Zeugma, which was a major crossing point of the Euphrates River, to the Roman province of Syria. To show his support for Augustus, Mithridates dropped the title Philhellen ("friend of the Greeks") from his Aulic titulature and adopted the title Philorhomaeus ("friend of the Romans") instead. Both titles were derived from the Commagenean royal cult that Mithridates' father had founded, and in which Mithridates played an important role. His other title Monocrites is an otherwise unattested title and was most likely a judicial function within the royal administration and a sign of his high social standing.

Mithridates had a brother, Antiochus II of Commagene, who was also a prince of the kingdom. In 29 BC, Antiochus was summoned to Rome and executed by Roman emperor Augustus, because Antiochus had caused the assassination of an ambassador whom Mithridates had sent to Rome.

== Sources ==
- Widengren, G. (1986). "Antiochus of Commagene". Encyclopaedia Iranica, Vol. II, Fasc. 2. pp. 135–136.
- Merz, Annette; Tieleman, Teun L (2012). The Letter of Mara bar Sarapion in Context: Proceedings of the Symposium Held at Utrecht University, 10-12 December 2009. Leiden: Brill. ISBN 9789004233010.
- Babaie, Sussan; Grigor, Talinn (2015). Persian Kingship and Architecture: Strategies of Power in Iran from the Achaemenids to the Pahlavis. I.B.Tauris. pp. 1–288. ISBN 9780857734778.
- Erskine, Andrew; Llewellyn-Jones, Lloyd; Wallace, Shane (2017). The Hellenistic Court: Monarchic Power and Elite Society from Alexander to Cleopatra. The Classical Press of Wales. ISBN 978-1910589625.
- Garsoian, Nina (2005). "Tigran II". Encyclopaedia Iranica.
- Marciak, Michał (2017). Sophene, Gordyene, and Adiabene: Three Regna Minora of Northern Mesopotamia Between East and West. BRILL. ISBN 9789004350724.
- Sartre, Maurice (2005). The Middle East Under Rome. Harvard University Press. ISBN 9780674016835.

Preceded by Antiochus I	King of Commagene; 31–20 BC	Succeeded by Mithridates III
