= Antiochis of Commagene =

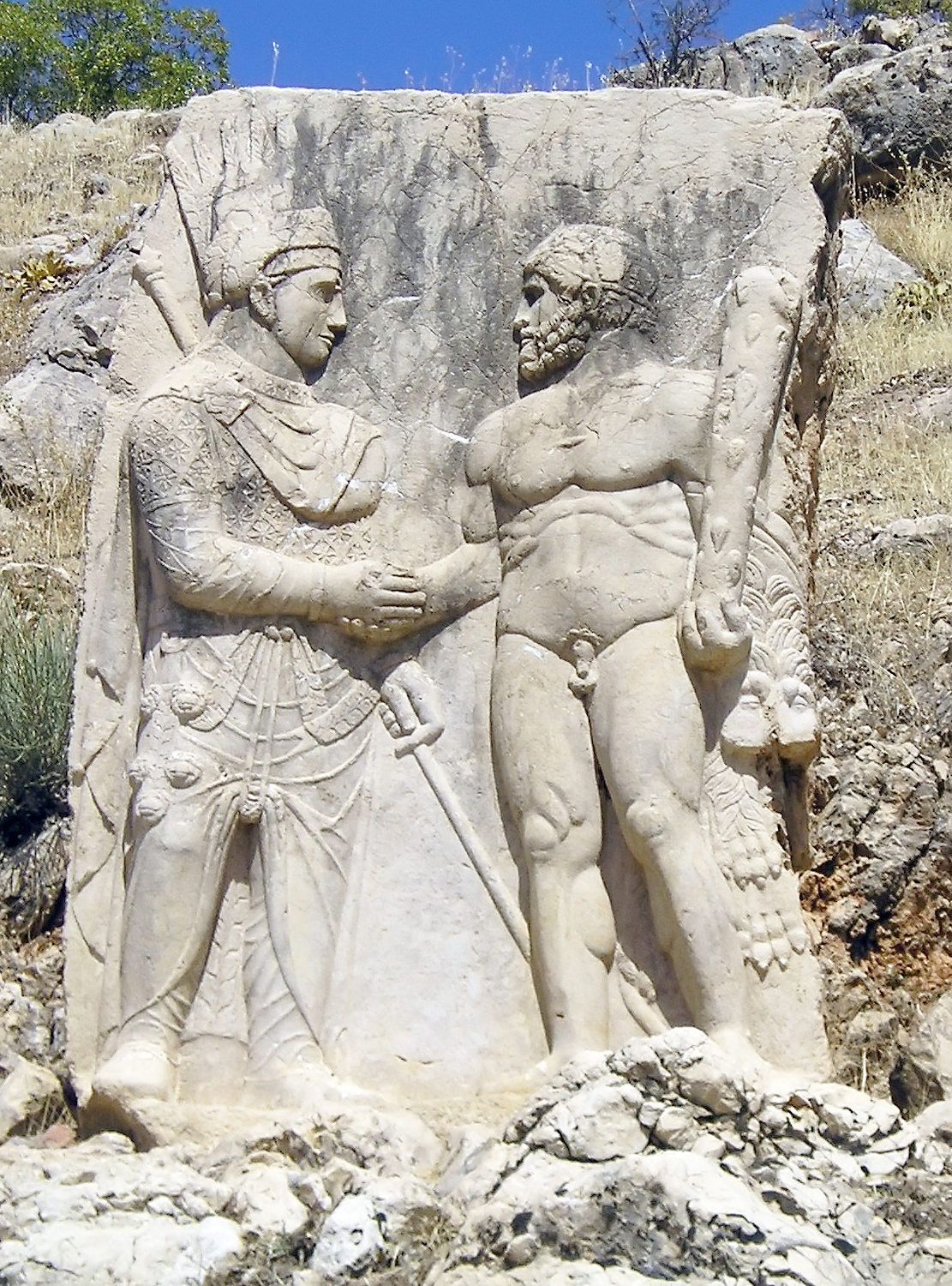
Antiochus I of Commagene and Herakles

Antiochis of Commagene (Ancient Greek: Aντιoχίς) — was a Princess from the Kingdom of Commagene, who lived in the 1st century BC. She was of Greek and Iranian descent.

== Life ==
Antiochis was the second daughter of King Antiochus I Theos of Commagene and Queen Isias Philostorgos. Unfortunately very little is known on Antiochis. The identity of her husband is unknown and she had a daughter called Aka, also known as Aka I of Commagene.

She appeared to have died of unknown causes sometime between the late 30s or early 20s BC. Antiochis was buried along with her mother and her daughter on a burial site known as the Karakush or Karakuş Tumulus. Her brother, the king Mithridates II, built their tomb, and wrote an inscription which praised his sister Antiochis, his niece Aka, and their mother, Isias.
