= Sames II Theosebes Dikaios =

King of Commagene from 130 to 109 BC

Samos II Theosebes Dikaios

King of Commagene
- Reign: 130–109 BC
- Predecessor: Ptolemaeus of Commagene
- Successor: Mithridates I Callinicus
- Spouse: Pythodoris
- Issue: Mithridates I Callinicus
- Dynasty: Orontid dynasty
- Father: Ptolemaeus of Commagene

Sames or Samos II Theosebes Dikaios (Greek: Σάμος Θεοσεβής Δίκαιος – died 109 BC) was the second king of Commagene. He was the son and successor of Ptolemaeus of Commagene.

Sames reigned as king between 130 and 109 BC. During his reign, Sames ordered the construction of the fortress at Samosata which is now submerged by the Atatürk Reservoir. Sames died in 109 BC. His wife was Pythodoris, daughter of the Kings of Pontus, and his son and successor was Mithridates I Callinicus.

== Sources ==
- Babaie, Sussan; Grigor, Talinn (2015). Persian Kingship and Architecture: Strategies of Power in Iran from the Achaemenids to the Pahlavis. I.B.Tauris. pp. 1–288. ISBN 9780857734778.
- Erskine, Andrew; Llewellyn-Jones, Lloyd; Wallace, Shane (2017). The Hellenistic Court: Monarchic Power and Elite Society from Alexander to Cleopatra. The Classical Press of Wales. ISBN 978-1910589625.
- Garsoian, Nina (2005). "Tigran II". Encyclopaedia Iranica.
- Marciak, Michał (2017). Sophene, Gordyene, and Adiabene: Three Regna Minora of Northern Mesopotamia Between East and West. BRILL. ISBN 9789004350724.
- Sartre, Maurice (2005). The Middle East Under Rome. Harvard University Press. ISBN 9780674016835.

| Preceded by Ptolemaeus of Commagene | King of Commagene; 130 BC – ca. 109 BC | Succeeded by Mithridates I Callinicus |
