= Norse-American medal =

US commemorative medal minted for the centennial of the voyage of the ship Restauration

- United States
- Diameter: Gold: 24 mm; Silver: 29 mm; Bronze: 69.5 mm
- Thickness: Gold: 2 mm; Thin silver: 1.6 mm; Thick silver: 2 mm; Bronze: 4.5 mm
- Edge: plain
- Composition: Gold: 90.0% gold, 10.0% copper; Silver: 90.0% silver, 10.0% copper; Bronze: 90.0% copper, 10.0% zinc, with silver plating
- Years of minting: 1925
- Mintage: Gold: 100 (less 47 melted); Thin silver: 6,000; Thick silver: 33,750; Bronze: est. 60–75
- Mint marks: None, all pieces struck at Philadelphia Mint without mint mark.

Obverse
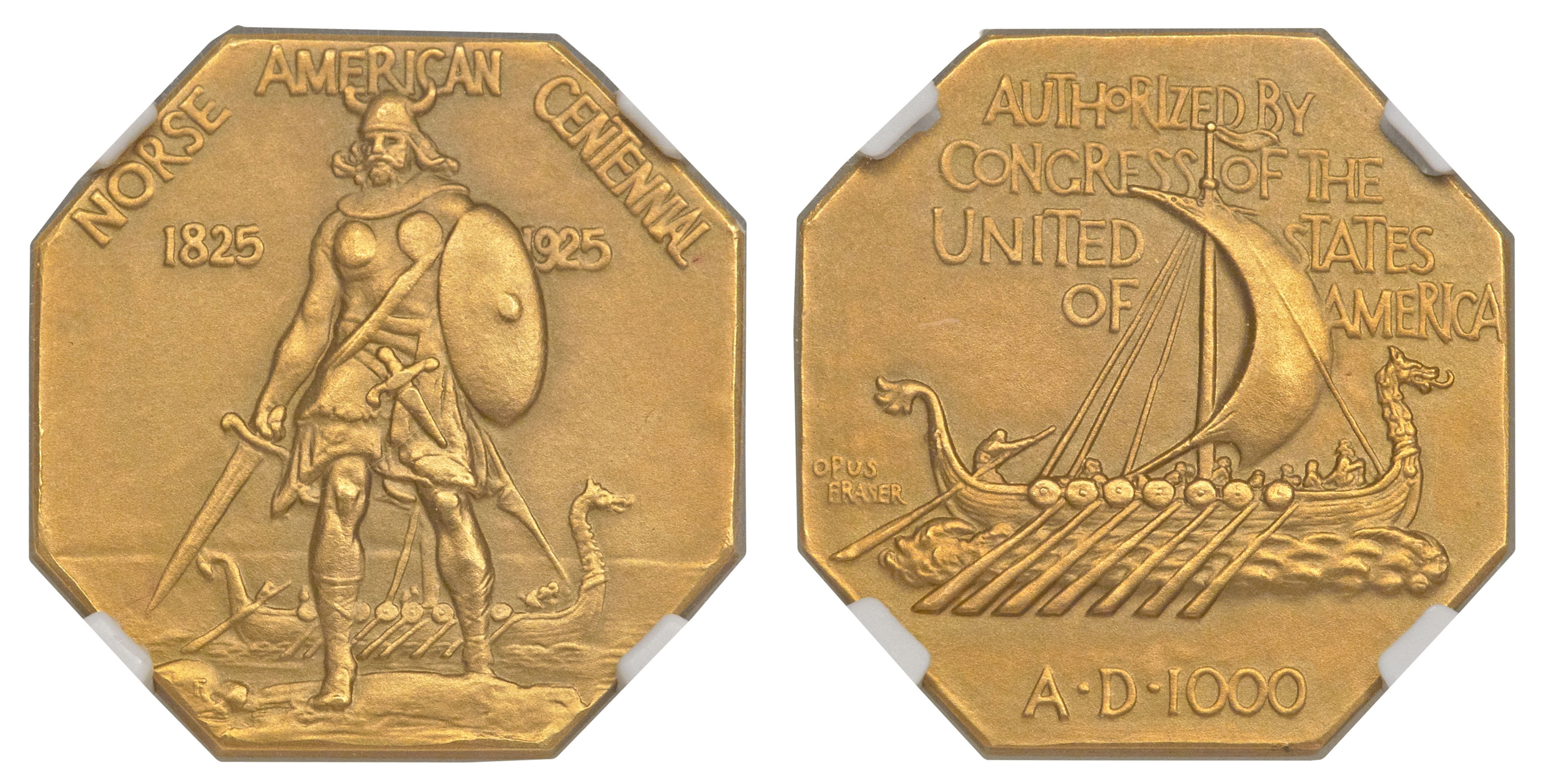
- Design: Viking warrior
- Designer: James Earle Fraser
- Design date: 1925

Reverse
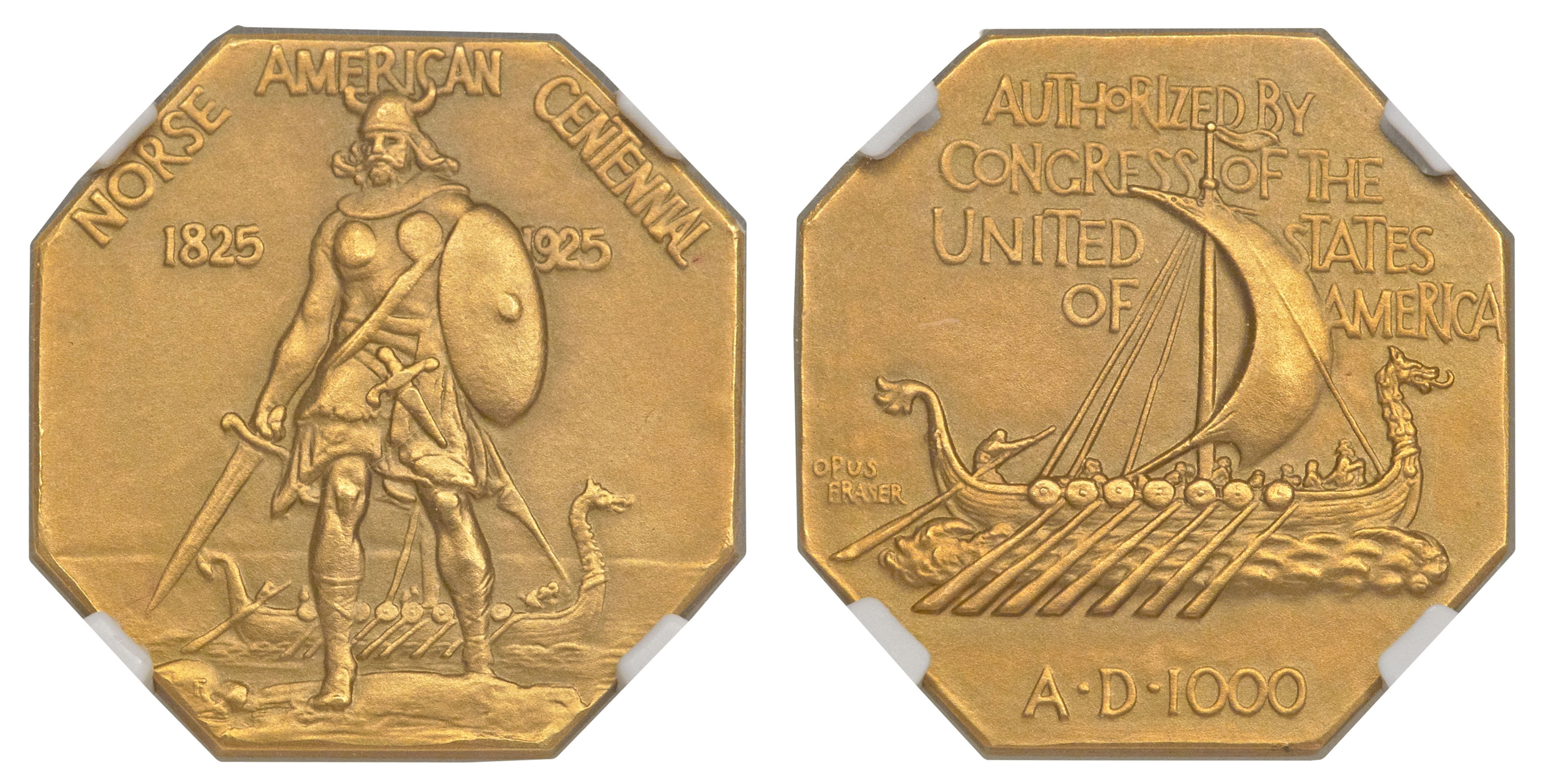
- Design: Viking longship
- Designer: James Earle Fraser
- Design date: 1925

The Norse-American medal was struck at the Philadelphia Mint in 1925, pursuant to an act of the United States Congress. It was issued for the 100th anniversary of the voyage of the ship Restauration, bringing early Norwegian immigrants to the United States.

U.S. Representative from Minnesota Ole Juulson Kvale, a Norwegian American, wanted a commemorative for the centennial celebrations of the Restauration journey. Rebuffed by the Treasury Department when he sought the issuance of a special coin, he instead settled for a medal. Sculpted by Buffalo nickel designer James Earle Fraser, the medals recognize those immigrants' Viking heritage, depicting a warrior of that culture on the obverse and his vessel on the reverse. The medals also recall the early Viking explorations of North America.

Once authorized by Congress, they were produced in various metals and sizes, for the most part prior to the celebrations near Minneapolis in June 1925. Only 53 were issued in gold, and they are rare and valuable today; those struck in silver or bronze have appreciated much less in value. They are sometimes collected as part of the U.S. commemorative coin series.

== Background and inception ==
On July 4 or 5, 1825, the vessel Restauration sailed from Stavanger, Norway, for the United States, with 45 emigrants aboard. According to what The New York Times deemed "bacchanalian" legends of its passage, the expedition anchored off an English coastal village and traded ashore some of its rum, only to depart in haste when local officials took an interest. Off Madeira, expedition leader Lars Larsen is said to have fished a cask from the sea, which proved to be filled with rare wine that was thoroughly enjoyed by those aboard. After they arrived in New York on October 9, the ship was seized pursuant to a court order, as the passengers exceeded the permitted number for a ship of its size by 21, counting a baby girl born to the Larsens en route. In addition, a fine was to be imposed, but because the immigrants spoke no English and had no knowledge of American laws, President John Quincy Adams issued a pardon, releasing the ship and remitting the fine. Initially settling on land they purchased near the shore of Lake Ontario, about 35 miles (56 km) from Rochester, New York, the passengers were the first of many organized groups of Norwegian Americans who crossed the Atlantic, especially to the northern and western United States.

Ole Juulson Kvale was a Minnesota congressman of the Farmer-Labor Party, and a proud Norse-American. Kvale was a member of the Norse-American Centennial Commission, which was to organize a 100th anniversary celebration of the Restauration's voyage. This celebration was important to a Norse-American community that had been perceived as antiwar during World War I, and was attempting to display both ethnic pride and assimilation. Kvale, a Lutheran minister, was also a member of the House Committee on Coinage, Weights, and Measures, and in January 1925 approached the Treasury Department, seeking its support for a commemorative coin in honor of the anniversary; he was told that the Treasury would oppose it. Commemorative coins for ethnic heritage groups were unlikely to pass Congress at that time due to the controversy caused by the 1924 Huguenot-Walloon Tercentenary half dollar, seen by some as Protestant propaganda.

On January 30, 1925, Kvale attended a meeting of the Coinage Committee, at which the proposal that would become the Vermont Sesquicentennial half dollar was considered. Treasury officials were present in opposition, suggesting a medal be issued instead, and Kvale asked several questions about the Mint's issuance of medals. On February 3, Kvale and his son Paul met with Treasury officials, bringing a draft bill authorizing the Bureau of the Mint to strike commemorative medals for the Restauration anniversary. Acting Mint Director Mary M. O'Reilly and Treasury Undersecretary Garrard Winston were dubious about the idea of striking silver medals that would be between the quarter and half dollar in size. To offset this concern, Paul Kvale suggested making the medal octagonal or hexagonal. O'Reilly and Winston favored the idea, and after Congressman Kvale met with legal counsel to the Treasury and other officials, he was assured of the department's full support. Kvale also successfully lobbied the Post Office Department for the issuance of commemorative stamps; he told Third Assistant Postmaster General Warren I. Glover that, in a broader sense, the medal recognized the North American explorations of the Vikings around the year 1000. Kvale declared that in seeking the souvenir medal and stamps, he was contributing to the "growth of the Norwegian heritage by having it 'preserved in metal' as well as 'paper time capsules'."

== Legislation ==
Kvale introduced a bill for a Norse-American medal in the House of Representatives on February 4, 1925. It was referred to the Committee on Coinage, Weights, and Measures. On behalf of that committee, Kvale reported it favorably to the full House on February 10. In the report, Kvale stated that the 40,000 medals would be struck without expense to the government, and that Treasury officials supported the bill. "In view of the importance of this celebration to the many descendants of the Norse immigrants into this country, and through these to the State of Minnesota, which is officially sponsoring the event, and to the great Northwest, which they have been such a large factor in developing, the committee believes that such a medal is fitting and proper and that this bill should be enacted into law."

South Dakota Senator Peter Norbeck also introduced legislation for a Norse-American medal on February 5, 1925. It was referred to the Committee on the Library. On the 6th, that committee was discharged of responsibility for the bill and it was referred instead to the Committee on Banking and Currency. Norbeck, on behalf of the Banking Committee, reported the bill favorably and without amendment to the Senate on February 13. It was passed by the Senate without objection or amendment on the 18th.

The Senate-passed bill then was transmitted to the House of Representatives, and was referred to the Coinage Committee on February 20. It was brought forward on February 27, 1925. When the Speaker, Frederick H. Gillett, asked if there was objection to the consideration of the bill, Ohio's James T. Begg wanted to know if there was anyone present who could give him information about it, and if there was not, he would object. Kvale stated that he could, and when Begg inquired if Treasury Secretary Andrew W. Mellon favored the bill, he assured the Ohioan that this was so. Kvale had the Senate-passed bill substituted for the one he had introduced, and it received the House's endorsement without objection or amendment. It was passed into law with the signature of President Calvin Coolidge on March 2, 1925.

The act provided for a maximum of 40,000 medals, to be struck at the Philadelphia Mint, from design models prepared by the Norse-American Centennial Commission. Medals would be turned over to a designated agent of the commission on payment of the cost of producing them. They were to be made subject to the provisions of section 52 of the Coinage Act of 1873. That section permitted medals of a national character to be struck at the Philadelphia Mint, but forbade Mint personnel from making dies for private medals, and was enacted after Philadelphia Mint Chief Coiner Franklin Peale had for some years run a private medals business on Mint premises, prior to his firing in 1854.

== Preparation ==
Kvale hoped that his friend and fellow Minnesotan, Senator Henrik Shipstead, could persuade sculptor Gutzon Borglum to design the medal for no fee or a nominal one. Borglum, who was busy with construction at Stone Mountain in Georgia (he would later sculpt Mount Rushmore), had designed the Stone Mountain Memorial half dollar; he had no time to accept the work. Buffalo nickel designer James Earle Fraser, a member of the Commission of Fine Arts, was engaged for a fee of $1,500, about the usual for a commemorative coin.

Fraser prepared designs and submitted them to the Mint; O'Reilly sent them to the Commission of Fine Arts on April 14, 1925. The commission approved them; its only suggestion was that the first "the" be removed from the inscription on the reverse, "AUTHORIZED BY THE CONGRESS OF THE UNITED STATES OF AMERICA", and this was done. Sketches had been printed in the Minneapolis Journal on March 29, provoking some reaction from those who felt that the design implied that Norwegians still dressed like Vikings in 1825, and that the date, 1000, should be moved from reverse to obverse to eliminate the confusion. The public objections had no effect on events.

== Design ==
Norse-American postal issue, 1925
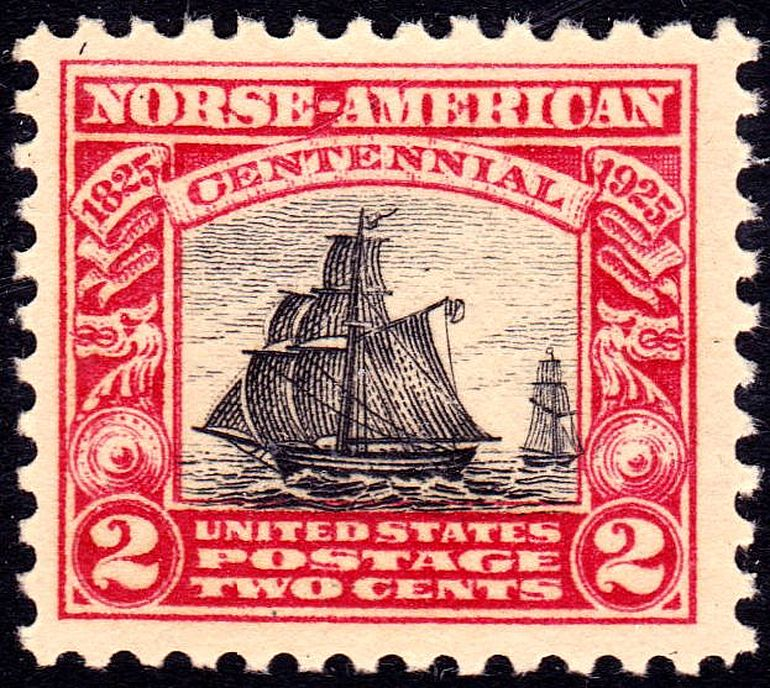
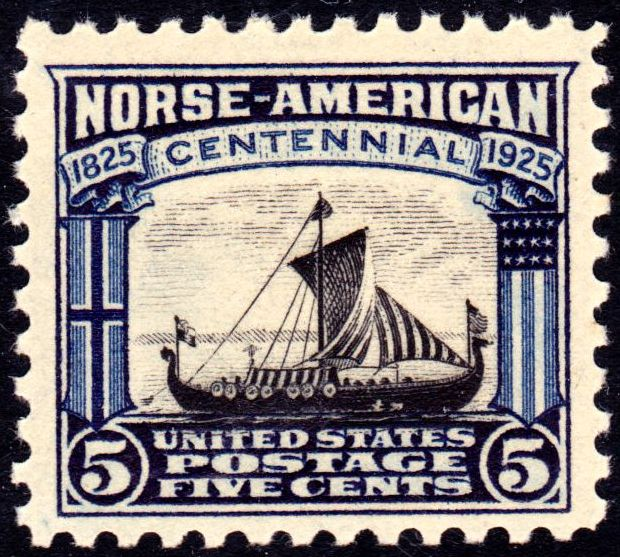
Issued for the anniversary, the two-cent depicts the Restauration and the five-cent a Viking vessel.

The obverse of the medal shows a Norwegian Viking chieftain who has just come ashore from his ship (seen behind him) and is armed for war, with horned helmet, shield, sword, and svard (dagger). He is intended to be landing at Vinland, the lands in the Americas explored and to some extent settled by the Vikings about the year 1000. The helmet is most likely an anachronism, as they are not believed to have been used for two millennia prior to the Vinland landing, and were probably ceremonial, rather than intended for battle. The centennial and the years are recognized on the obverse. The reverse shows a Viking ship, along with the authorization by Congress and the approximate year in which Vinland was settled. "OPUS FRASER" (Fraser's work), the artist's signature, is to the left of the ship.

Numismatist Anthony Swiatek, in his volume on commemoratives, wonders if Leif Erikson, the famed explorer of that period, would not have been a superior choice. He concludes that Kvale would not have supported such a depiction, because "he was interested in pure romanticization. He saw a Viking ship and his chieftain in full regalia".

Julie Shultz, in her journal article on the 1925 celebration, finds it significant that the medal has nothing to do with the arrival of the Restauration in an already-formed United States, but symbolizes ethnic pride in the early explorers. Noting that one of the stamps depicts a Viking ship and the other the Restauration, she concludes of these three government issues for the celebration: "Though outwardly, these souvenirs were to symbolize the Norwegian immigrant heritage that began in 1825, they actually invert the dominant narrative by using an American form to proclaim that Norwegians were the first Europeans to land on American soil."

== Production, distribution, and collecting ==
Six thousand silver medals on a thin (1.6 mm) planchet were struck between May 21 and 23, 1925, at the Philadelphia Mint. They were handled like ordinary coins: They were counted, bagged, and transported to the Fourth Street National Bank of Philadelphia for the centennial commission's use. Between May 29 and June 13, a total of 33,750 pieces were struck on a thick (2 mm) silver planchet. The reason for the two varieties is uncertain; Swiatek theorizes that the Norse-American Centennial Commission might not have liked how the thin ones looked, or might have wanted collectors to buy two medals. One hundred were struck in gold, on June 3 and 4—Kvale received the second one struck. The medals cost the commission 30 cents each for the thin ones, 45 cents for the thick, and $10.14 for the gold. The retail price of the thin ones is uncertain (Swiatek estimates $1.75), the thick ones are known to have cost $1.25, and the gold pieces about $20. They were sold by mail order; none were sold at the celebrations or in person. There was a sales limit of one per person, but purchasers could buy on behalf of as many family members as they wanted. The thin pieces were not offered for sale until November or December 1925, and sold mostly to numismatists—the commission's secretary, J.A. Horvik, was frustrated that more "Norsemen" were not buying the medal. After the celebrations, Kvale took 5,000 medals to New York, hoping to sell them, but was not successful. Of the 100 gold pieces struck, 47 were eventually returned to the Treasury when they could not be sold, and some of the silver pieces (most likely thick ones) were as well.

The Norse-American Immigration Centennial Celebration was held at the Minnesota State Fairgrounds near Minneapolis from June 6–9, 1925. Automobile caravans were organized to bring attendees from the Red River Valley, bearing the slogan, "The Norsemen are Coming!" President Coolidge was present; he called the Viking explorers "these sons of Thor and Odin", and told attendees, "the pledge of the Norwegian people has never yet gone unredeemed. I have every faith that through the vigorous performance of your duties you will add new lustre to your glories in the days to come." The New York Times noted that commemorative stamps and a congressionally authorized medal had been issued for the celebration. "Seldom before has the celebration of a similar event been so honored by the Government, as has this centennial."

The Times had inaccurately described the medal as "the first commemorative medal to be issued in the history of the mint". The publicity people for the celebration had billed it as the first medal to be issued pursuant to an act of Congress, but in October 1925, Mint Director Robert J. Grant learned that a medal had been authorized by Congress for the centennial of American independence in 1876, and it had been issued in different sizes. He informed Kvale, who was intrigued by the fact that the independence medal had been issued in a 3-inch (76 mm) size. The congressman felt that the larger size would allow the detail of his medal to be better shown, which would help when one was exhibited in a museum display case. Not all members of his board were enthusiastic about the idea, but between 60 and 75 of these larger medals were struck, likely in December at the Philadelphia Mint, with Kvale undertaking to purchase any that were not sold. They were plated in silver by a private firm in Washington, D.C., and about 30 were presented or mailed to dignitaries, including one to President Coolidge.

The Norse-American medal is not a coin, and is not legal tender. Due to its similarity to a coin, and the fact that it was authorized by Congress, it is sometimes collected as part of the U.S. commemorative coin series. Though the silver ones can be purchased for less than $100 up to $500, and the silver-plated one for between $500 and $3,500, the gold specimen has sold for as high as $40,000. Some medals were used as pocket pieces or worn in mountings to the fair, and display damage or wear.

== Sources ==
- Blegen, Theodore C. (1940). Norwegian Migration to America: The American Transition. Haskell House Publishers Ltd. OCLC 423581.
- Shultz, April (March 1991). "'The Pride of the Race Had Been Touched': The 1925 Norse-American Immigration Centennial and Ethnic Identity". Journal of American History. 77 (4): 1265–1295. doi:10.2307/2078262. ISSN 0021-8723. JSTOR 2078262. S2CID 163240744. (subscription required)
- Swiatek, Anthony (2012). Encyclopedia of the Commemorative Coins of the United States. Chicago: KWS Publishers. ISBN 978-0-9817736-7-4.
- Taxay, Don (1983). The U.S. Mint and Coinage (reprint of 1966 ed.). New York: Sanford J. Durst Numismatic Publications. ISBN 978-0-915262-68-7.
- United States House of Representatives Committee on Coinage, Weights, and Measures (January 23, 1928). Coinage of 50-Cent Pieces in Commemoration of Sesquicentennial of Discovery of Hawaii. United States Government Printing Office. (subscription required)
- United States House of Representatives Committee on Coinage, Weights and Measures (1925). Coinage of 50 Cent Pieces in Commemoration of the One Hundred and Fiftieth Anniversary of the Battle of Bennington and the Independence of Vermont. United States Government Printing Office.
