= Reinalda van Eymeren =

Dutch nun

Reinalda van Eymeren (1463 – 1540) was a Dutch nun at St Agnes Convent, Arnhem, who has been proposed as the author of the highly influential, anonymous Middle Dutch spiritual text Die Evangelische Peerle (The Pearl of the Gospel), first published in 1535, and Vanden Tempel onser sielen (Of the Temple of Our Soul), first published 1543. Those who do not accept the attribution ascribe these works to an Anonieme Maagd ("Anonymous Virgin").

Reinalda was born in Arnhem in 1463, the daughter of Wichman van Eymeren and his wife Andrea. Her father was an alderman in the city government. She spent most of her life as a sister in the Convent of St Agnes, where she was remarked for her total abstinence from fish and meat, her frequent communion, and her musical talents. She died on 28 January 1540 and was buried in the church of the Brethren of the Common Life in Arnhem, demolished in 1805.

In 1987, an imagined portrait of her was installed in the "gallery of honour" in the Cathedral of St Bavo, Haarlem.

Her authorship of Die Evangelische Peerle is not generally accepted, and some have even questioned her existence.
