= St Agnes Convent, Arnhem =

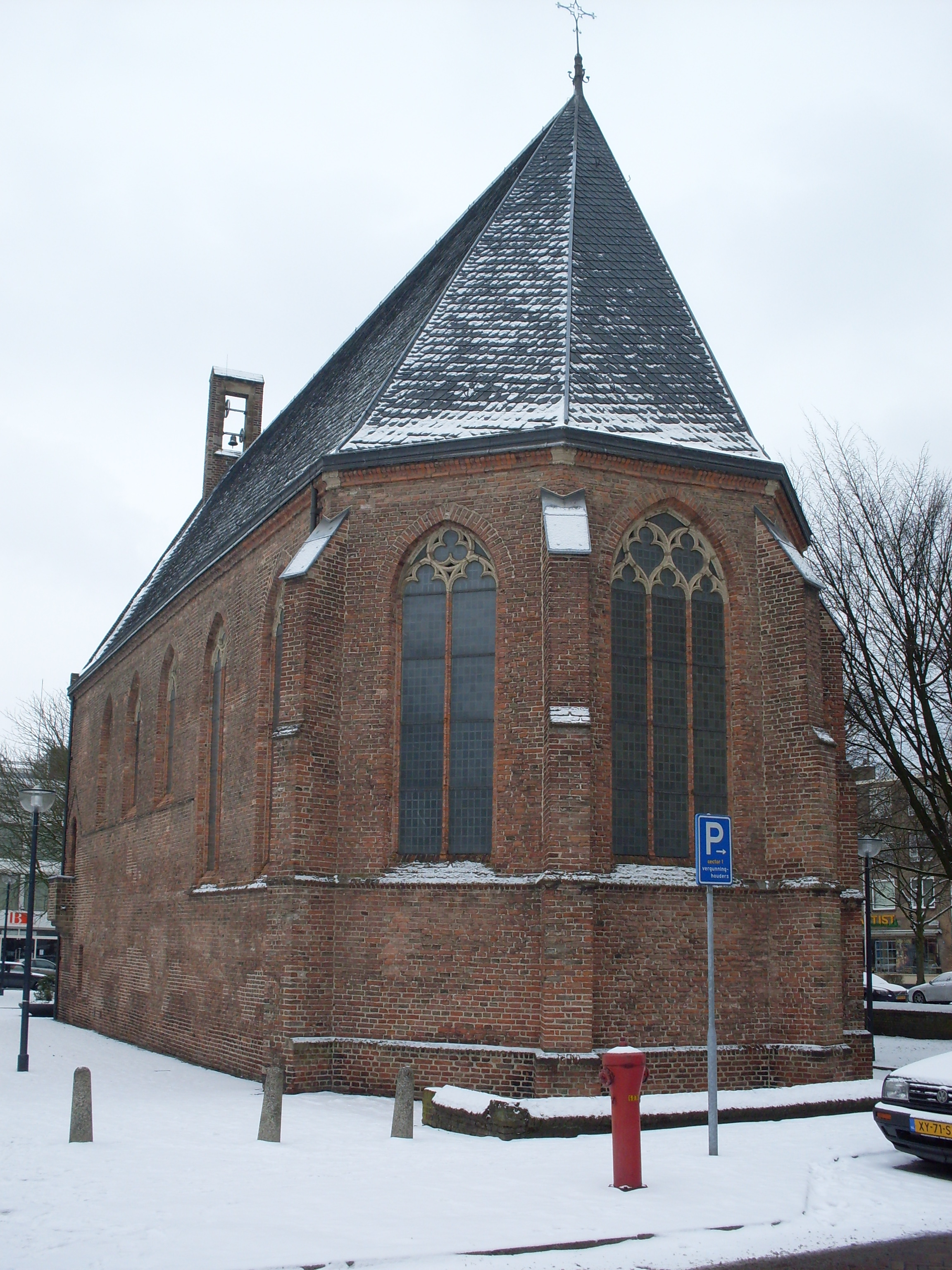
The Walloon Church in Arnhem: all that remains of the former Convent of St Agnes

St Agnes Convent was a religious house of the Sisters of the Common Life in the city of Arnhem, in the Duchy of Guelders (now in the Netherlands), in the 15th and 16th centuries.

At some point in the 15th century the community adopted the Third Rule of St Francis, later shifting to the Rule of St Augustine. It was a large community, and a major centre for the production of mystical literature. Reinalda van Eymeren, who has been suggested as the author of the influential spiritual text Die Evangelische Peerle (The Pearl of the Gospel), was a member of the community.

In 1581, during the Dutch Revolt, the city forbade new entrants to the convent. The last four sisters to survive dissolved the community in 1634.

The buildings passed to St Catherine's Hospital in 1636. In 1751 the former convent chapel became the Walloon church in Arnhem. This was damaged during the Second World War and restored in 1950-1952; it is now protected heritage as Rijksmonument 8310.
