= Nieuwe Waalse Kerk =

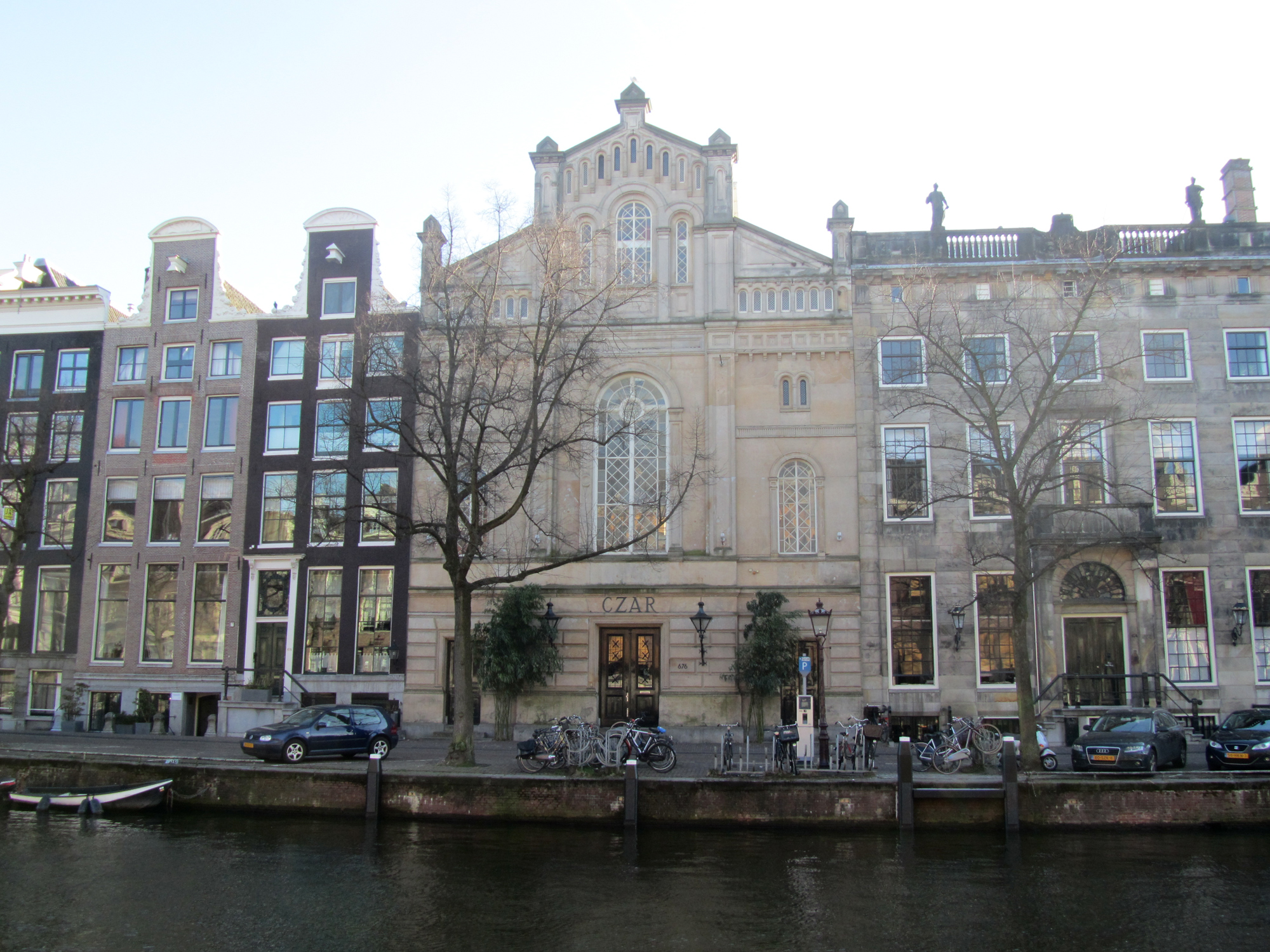
- Facade on Keizersgracht canal
- Interactive map of the Nieuwe Waalse Kerk area

General information
- Architectural style: Eclecticism, neoclassical architecture, Romanesque Revival architecture
- Location: Keizersgracht 676, Amsterdam, Netherlands
- Coordinates: 52°21′47.91″N 4°53′37.57″E
- Construction started: 1854
- Opened: 1856

Design and construction
- Architect: A.N. Godefroy

The Nieuwe Waalse Kerk (Dutch for "New Walloon Church") is a late 19th-century church building on the Keizersgracht canal in Amsterdam. The building, a rare example of Romanesque Revival architecture in Amsterdam, has rijksmonument status.

== Description ==
The architect, A.N. Godefroy, was a proponent of eclecticism, something that is evident from his design for the Nieuwe Waalse Kerk. The building is a mixture of various styles: neoclassical architecture (the stone facade with a rusticated base) and Romanesque Revival architecture (the small round recessed windows and the Lombard band along the edge of the roof). Godefroy also mixed traditional styles with techniques and materials that at that time were considered new and innovative. For instance, he designed folding chairs for the church that had a faux wood texture, but were actually made of cast iron. Godefroy also used cast iron for the columns supporting the galleries.

The symmetrical facade has a base and tall, Romanesque arched windows. The facade is topped by five small towers. The facade was segmented using horizontal water tables and vertical lesenes.

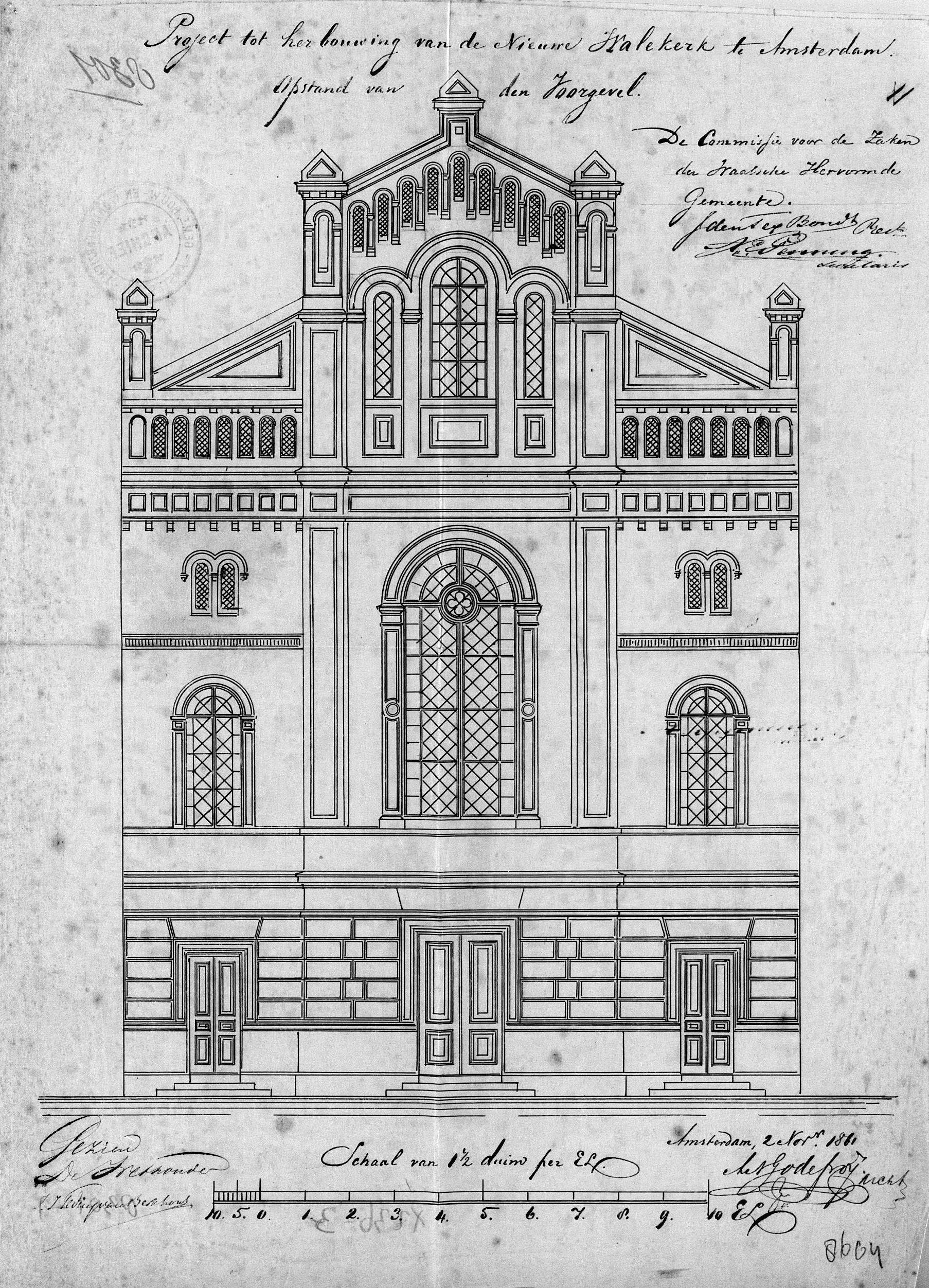
Facade design by A.N. Godefroy

The church hall is a rectangular space lined on both sides by galleries supported by cast-iron columns. The walls are decorated with pilasters and arched alcoves. When the church was repurposed as an arts centre in the late 20th century, an additional storey was added.

The pulpit and the balustrade over the pulpit date to around 1910, and may have been designed by Karel de Bazel.

== History ==
In the 17th and 18th centuries, the number of Huguenots in Amsterdam grew rapidly. The original French Calvinist church, the Waalse Kerk ("Walloon Church") on Oudezijds Achterburgwal canal, could no longer accommodate all those who came to attend services, so in 1719 the French Calvinist community opened a second church, known as the Nieuwe Waalse Kerk ("New Walloon Church") or Petite Eglise (French for "Small Church"), in a disused bell foundry on Prinsengracht canal, at the corner with Molenpad. The original Waalse Kerk came to be known as the Oude Waalse Kerk ("Old Walloon Church") to distinguish it from the new church. In 1808, the new church (as well as many other Walloon churches in the Netherlands) was shut down by royal decree.

In 1841, the Huguenots purchased a building at Keizersgracht 676. The house, which dated to 1671 and was designed by Adriaan Dortsman, was to be demolished and replaced with a new church building. Construction of the church did not begin until 1854, however. In 1856, the first church services were held in this Nieuwe Waalse Kerk.

The church was originally illuminated using gas chandeliers. The use of gas was at that time was an innovative new way to light all the lamps at once.

In 1861, a fire broke out in the Nieuwe Waalse Kerk, causing the roof to collapse. Most of the interior was lost, although the cast-iron folding chairs survived the fire. The church was subsequently restored under the supervision of the original architect, Godefroy.

The building was repurposed in 1989 as the arts centre Artemis. An additional storey was added to the building for dance and music studios. As of 2012, the building is in use as the offices of an advertising production agency.

In 2001 the building attained rijksmonument status.
