= Walloon Church, Amsterdam =

Coordinates: 52°22′15″N 4°53′50″E

Walloon Church
- Église Wallonne
- Waalse Kerk
- Walloon Church
- Country: Netherlands
- Denomination: Protestant
- Website: Official website

Architecture
- Heritage designation: Rijksmonument
- Designated: 1970
- Completed: 1409

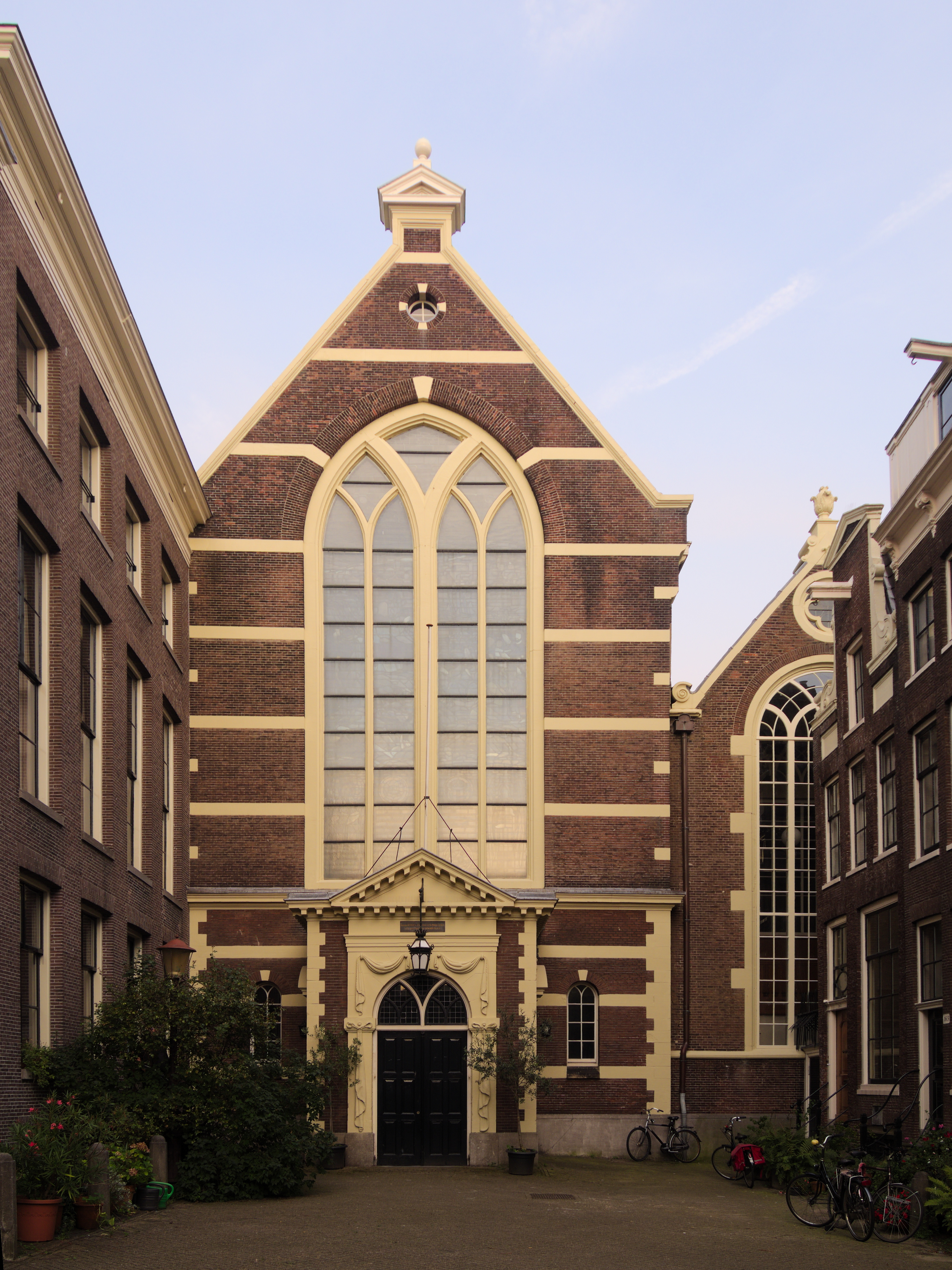
Front facade of the church on Walenpleintje square

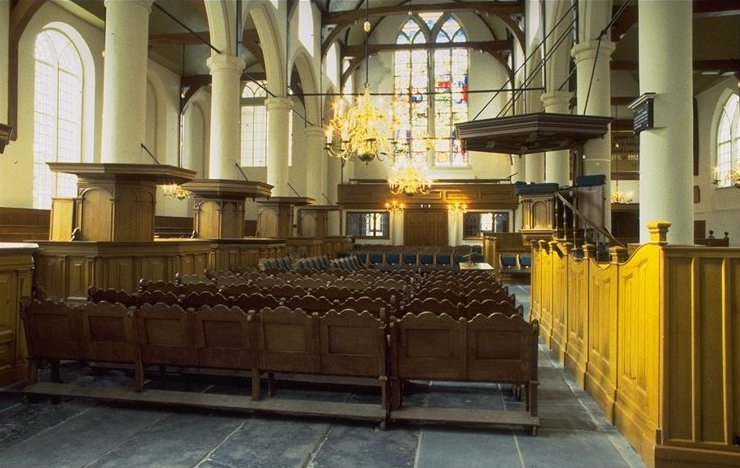
Church interior

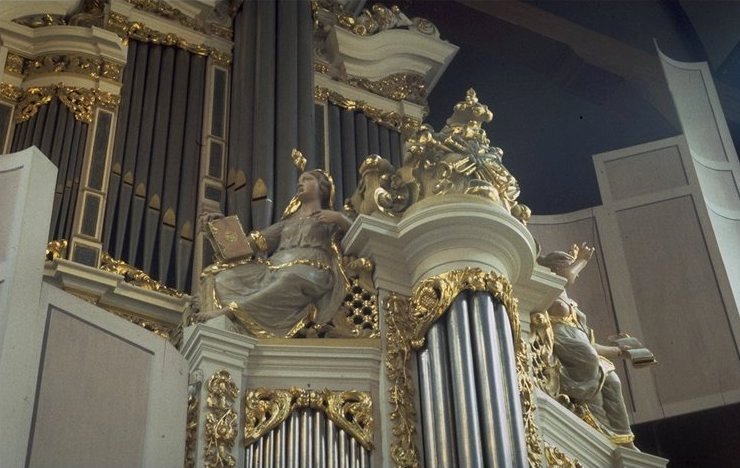
Church organ

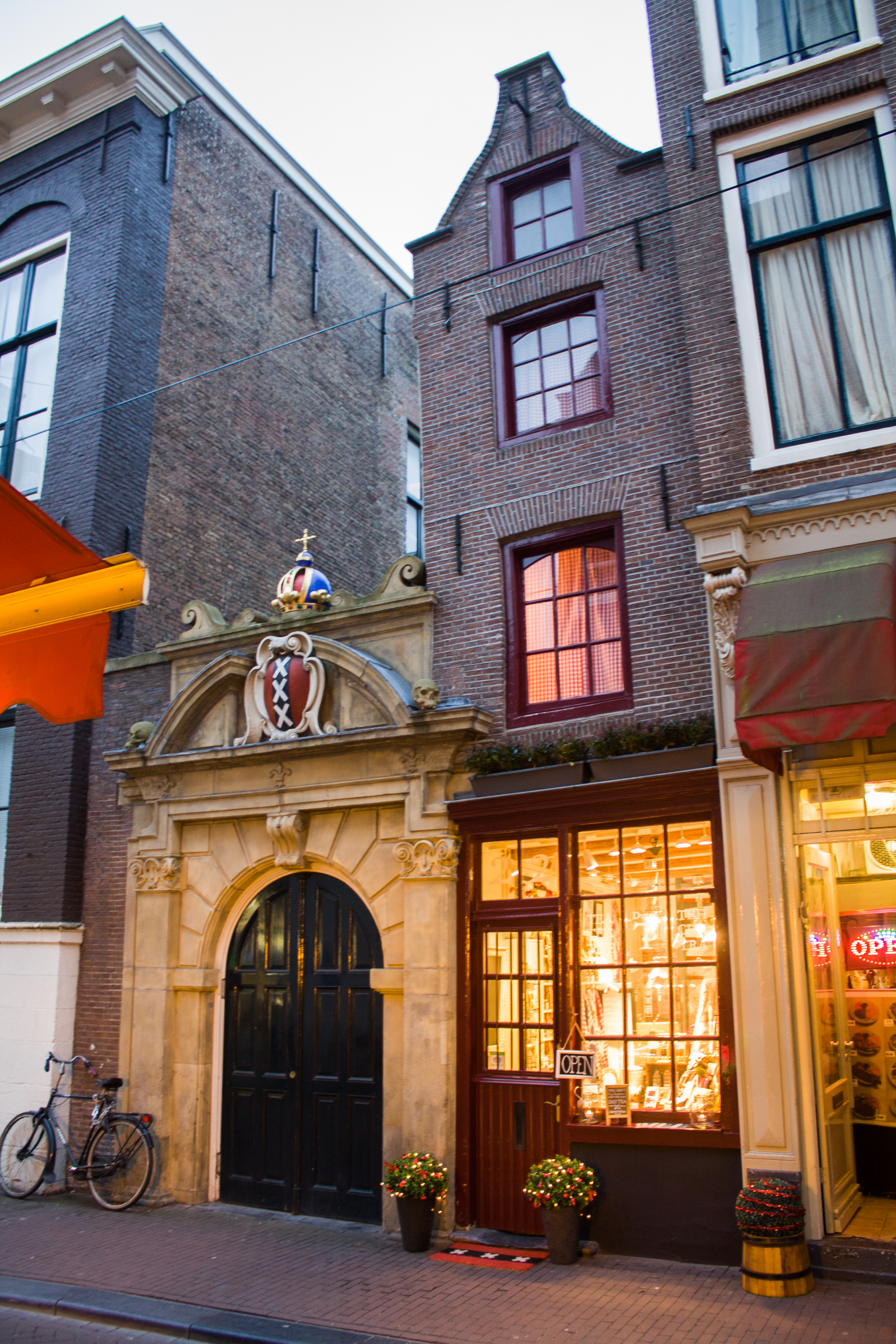
The northern gate, adorned with skulls

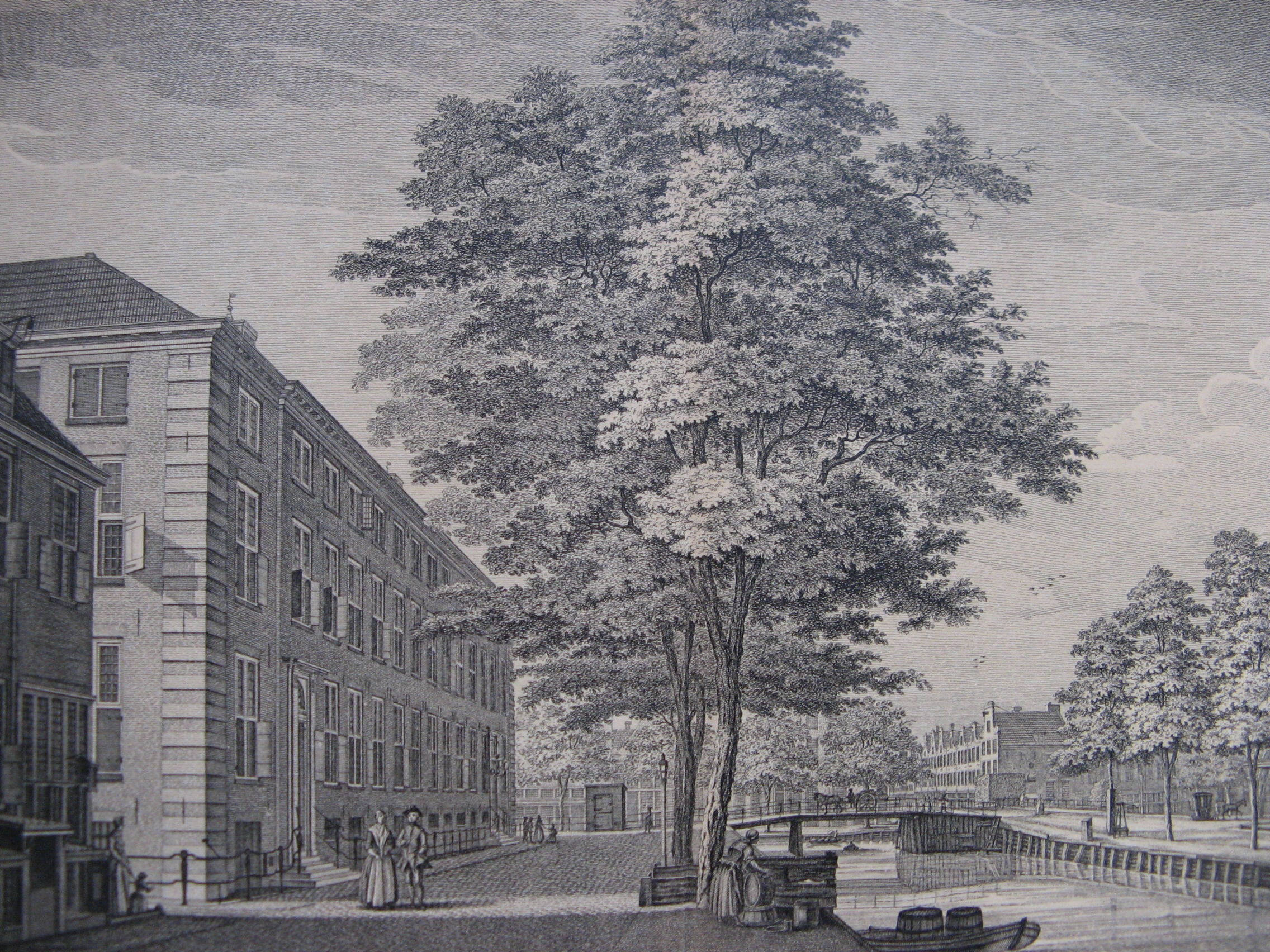
The church's orphanage on Vijzelgracht canal around 1780

The Walloon Church (Dutch: Waalse Kerk; French: Église Wallonne) is a Protestant church building in Amsterdam, along the southern stretch of the Oudezijds Achterburgwal canal. The building dates to the late 15th century and has been in use as a Walloon church since 1586. The church was also known as the Franse Kerk ("French Church"), Walenkerk ("Walloons' Church"), Oude Walenkerk ("Old Walloons' Church"), or Oude Waalse Kerk ("Old Walloon Church").

The painter Bartholomeus van der Helst (1613-1670) and the scientist Jan Swammerdam (1637-1680) are buried in the church. Elizabeth Timothy (1702-1757), the first female American newspaper editor and publisher, was most likely christened there. The painter Vincent van Gogh visited the church regularly in the 1870s to attend sermons delivered by his uncle Johannes Paulus Stricker.

The building has held rijksmonument status since 1970.

== History ==
The Walloon Church was originally the chapel of a Roman Catholic monastery, the Sint-Paulusbroederklooster. The monastery's first chapel was built in 1409 but most likely destroyed during the fire of 1452. In 1493, the monastery received permission to build a new chapel, which was taken into use three years later. Following the 1578 Alteratie (the Protestant Reformation in Amsterdam), the chapel was confiscated by the city government. It was used as a storeroom and for various other purposes until 1586, when it was offered to the Walloon Reformed community of religious refugees, French-speaking Protestants who had fled religious persecution in the Southern Netherlands and France. It was one of a large number of Walloon churches established in the Dutch Republic during this period — at least fifteen in the period 1571-1590 alone.

In 1616, a new entrance was added on the north side of the church, with a gate designed by city architect Hendrick de Keyser. The gate, which gave access to Oude Hoogstraat street, was decorated with skulls, a nod to the funeral processions which passed through this gate. The front gate of the church, in Classical style, dates to 1647.

The church, consisting of a central nave and a northern semitransept, was extended in 1661 with a southern semitransept. The revocation of the Edict of Nantes in 1685 led to another wave of Protestant refugees from France, greatly swelling the Walloon community in Amsterdam. In order to accommodate the larger community, the church was extended with galleries on three sides. The church nevertheless proved too small, so a second church was opened in a disused bell foundry on Prinsengracht canal in 1716. The Walloon church was subsequently known as the Oude Waalse Kerk ("Old Walloon Church") or Grande Église ("Great Church") to distinguish it from the second church, known as the Nieuwe Waalse Kerk ("New Walloon Church") of Petite Église ("Lesser Church").

The church underwent further renovations in 1816 and 1891, among others, during which the galleries were again removed. In 1990-1992, the church was restored, whereby the foundations were restored to stop the church from sinking, caused by the front facade installed in 1885. During this restoration, so many tombstones were found that a decision was made to replace the concrete floor with a new, self-supporting floor with its own foundation. The balcony was also restored.

The small square in front of the church, known colloquially as the Walenpleintje ("Little Walloon Square"), was officially given this name in 1976. The address of the church is Walenpleintje 159, as the street numbering still follows that of the Oudezijds Achterburgwal canal.

A plaque in the northern semitransept of the church carries the French inscription Fondée en 1409; Restaurée en 1647; Agrandie en 1661; Rebâtie en 1816; Restaurée en 1891 par le troupeau Wallon et par ceux qui s'intéressent à son culte; Restaurée, ameliorée et renovée en 1991 et 1992.

=== Gunshots in the church ===
On 12 October 1755, a French baker's assistant entered the church during services and fired several rifle shots at the vicar. The baker's servant had fallen in love with the daughter of a rich merchant, far above his station, and the girl's father had requested that the vicar put an end to the love affair, which had infuriated the baker's servant.

The vicar was only grazed by a bullet, but was so startled that he fell backwards. The door of the pulpit had not been properly shut, causing the vicar to fall down the stairs leading up to the pulpit. The fall left him with a severe head injury, but he survived and recovered from his injuries. The baker's assistant tried to flee the scene, but was arrested and locked away in the Rasphuis prison for a number of years.

The incident left a number of bullet holes in the pulpit and the adjacent pillar. These were however hidden during the 1990 restoration.

=== Organ ===
The church received its first pipe organ in 1680, built by the Ghent organ builder Nicolaas Langlez. This organ however proved unsatisfactory and was frequently altered until Christian Müller was commissioned in 1733 to build an entirely new organ, which was taken into use the next year. This organ is still in use and is considered the best-preserved of the Müller organs still in existence. In subsequent years the organ was repeatedly repaired and altered, until the church in 1960 decided to restore the organ to its original state. This restoration by organ builders Ahrend & Brunzema was completed in 1965, followed by a second restoration in 1993 and a third in the year 2000.

=== Orphanage ===
The Walloon Church in 1631 purchased three buildings on Laurierstraat in the Jordaan district of Amsterdam and opened an orphanage there. Not only orphans but also widows and elderly were housed there. In 1683 the orphanage was moved to a building on Vijzelgracht canal, which remained in use as an orphanage until 1967. The building housed French cultural center Institut français des Pays-Bas until 2016.

== Sources ==
- Amsterdam Bureau Monumenten en Archeologie
- Waalse Kerk Amsterdam (Dutch)
- Amsterdamse Poortjes: Walenplein (Dutch, archived)
- Het Parool - Mooiste Amsterdamse straat (Dutch, archived)

== See also ==
- Walloon church
