= Jugate =

Portrait arrangement

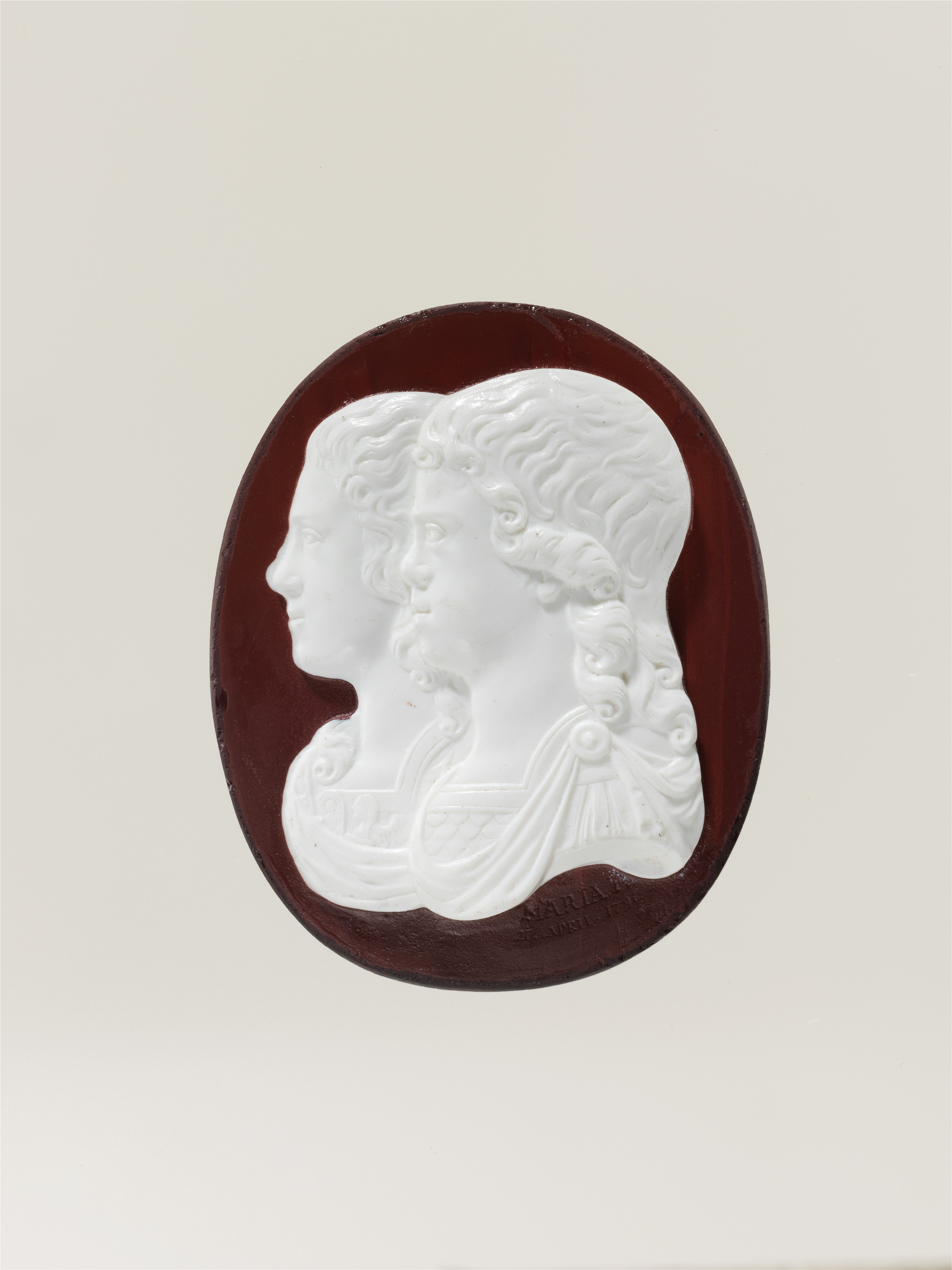
Jugate busts of Czarevitch Paul and Maria Feodorovna

A jugate consists of two portraits side by side to suggest, to the viewer, the closeness of each to the other.

== Etymology ==
The word comes from the Latin, jugatus, meaning joined or overlapping.

== Use ==
On coins, it is commonly used for married couples, brothers, a father and son, or ruler and divinity. Jugates are most often seen on pin-back buttons, but may also be seen on medals, posters or other campaign items. If a third figure appears on the item, it is called a trigate.

=== Political use ===
In political contexts, it refers to the pairing of candidates with an emphasis on their joint candidacy and collaboration on campaign ideas. Often this would be a presidential and vice presidential candidates, although sometimes a state or local candidate is included with a presidential candidate. Voters may be better able to connect with and see the candidates as a coherent team thanks to these pictures. Campaign posters, banners, and other promotional items featuring candidates collectively was a method of reinforcing the notion of a cohesive leadership.

== Gallery ==
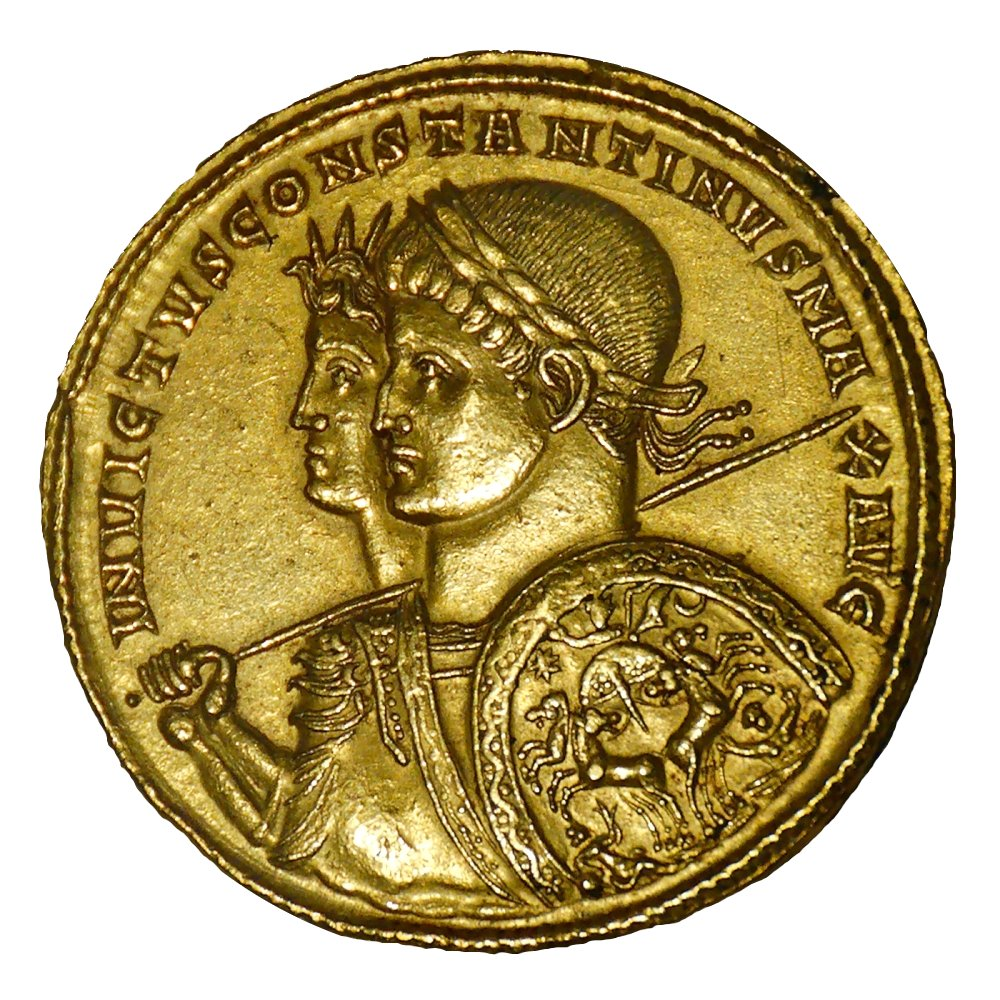
A coin struck in 313, depicting Constantine I as the companion of a solar deity

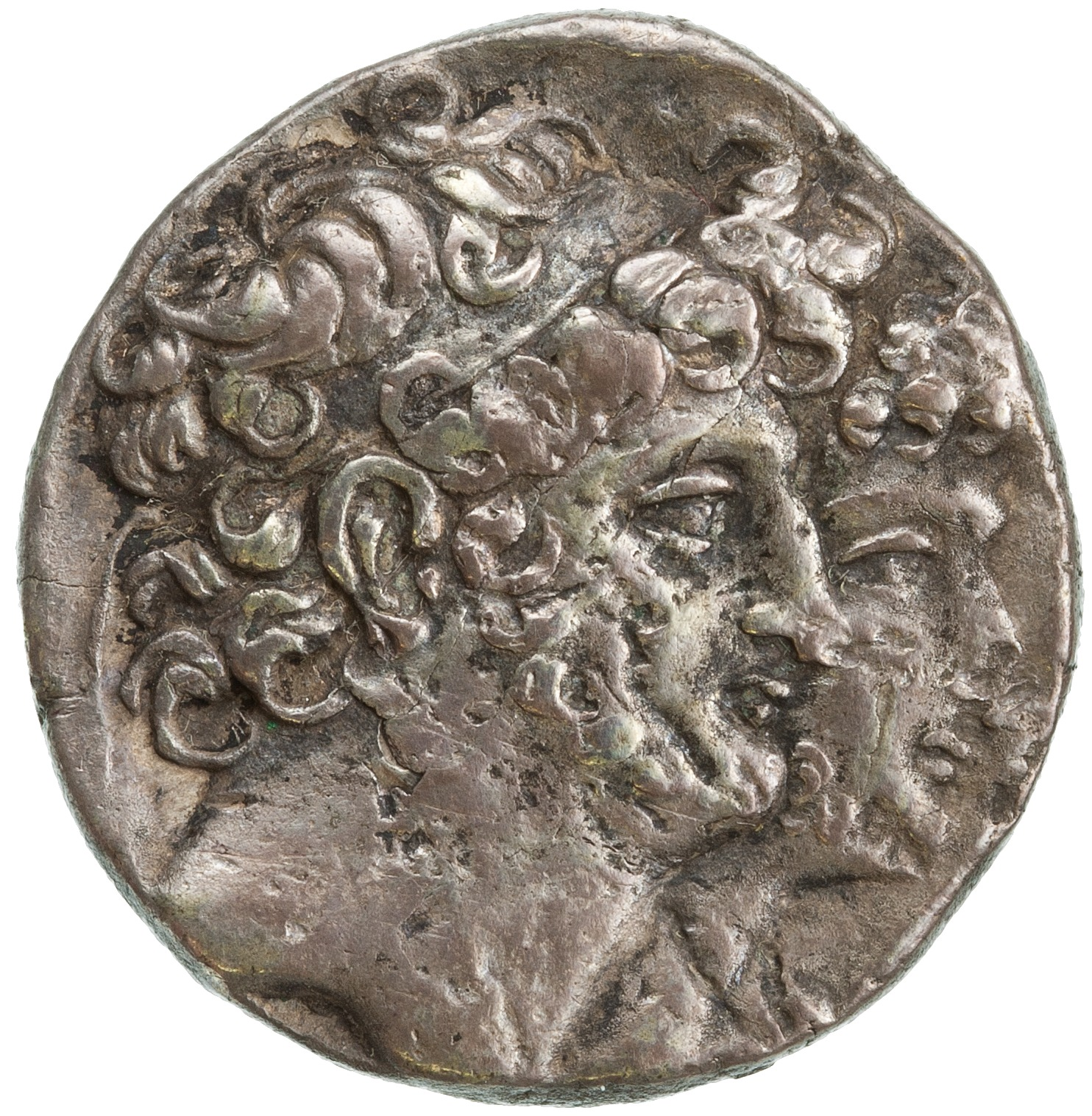
Jugate of brothers Antiochus XI Epiphanes and Philip I Philadelphus

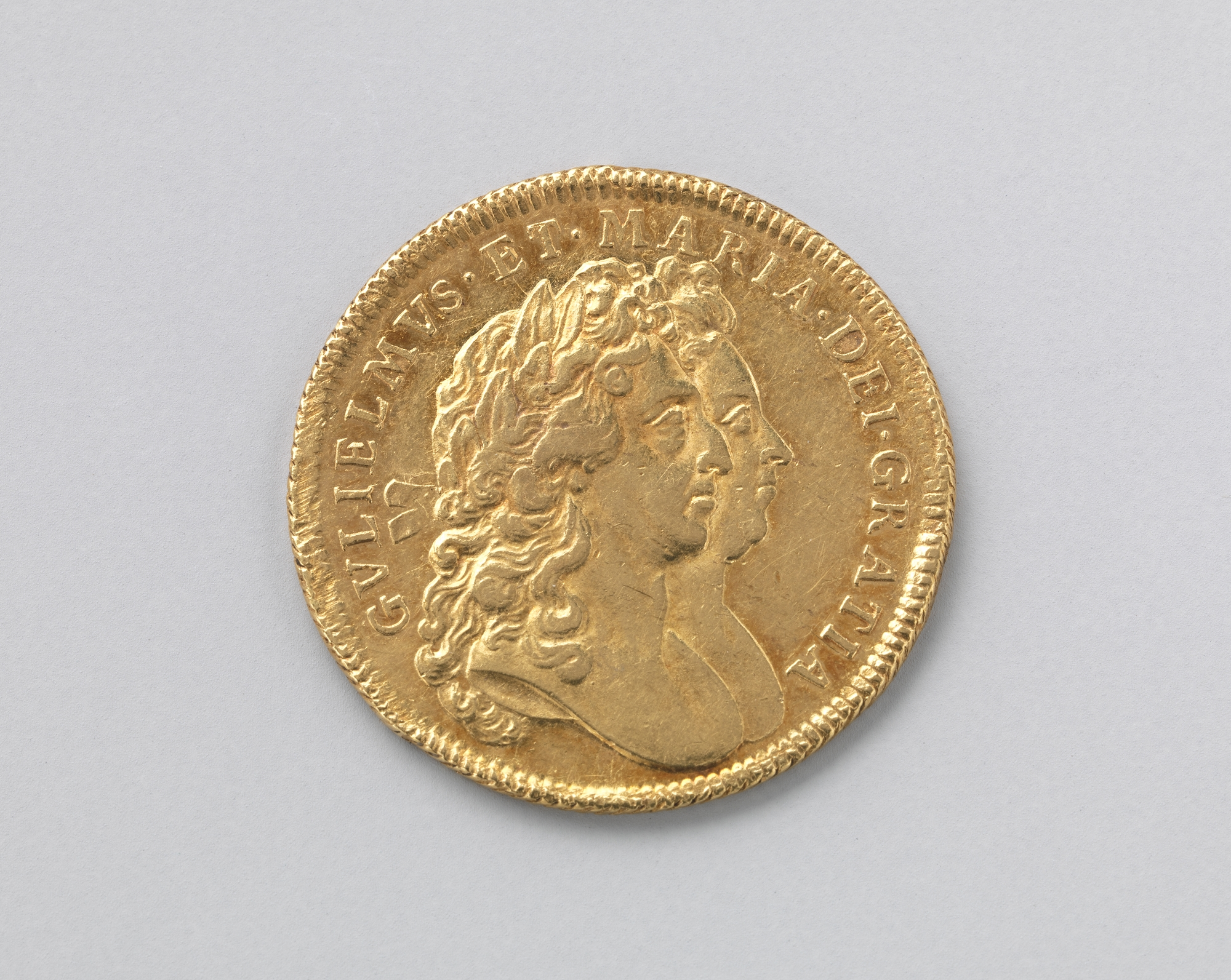
Jugate of a married couple: William of Orange and Mary II of England

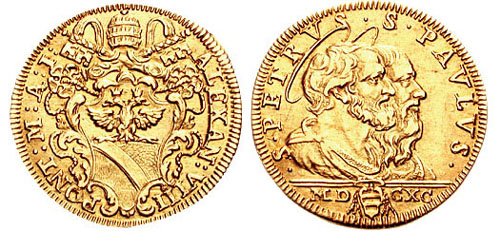
Jugate coin of Saint Peter and Saint Paul

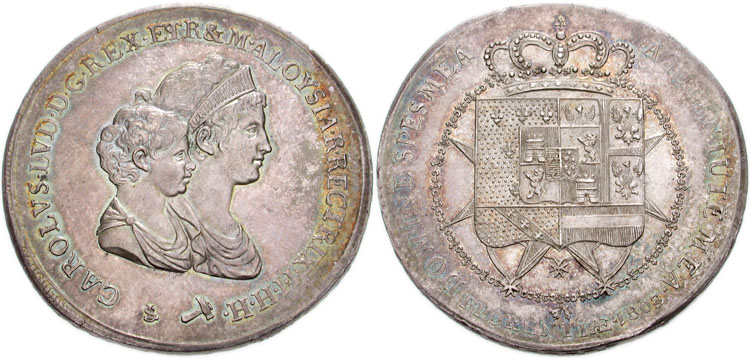
Jugate of a son and mother: Charles II, Duke of Parma and Maria Luisa, Duchess of Lucca

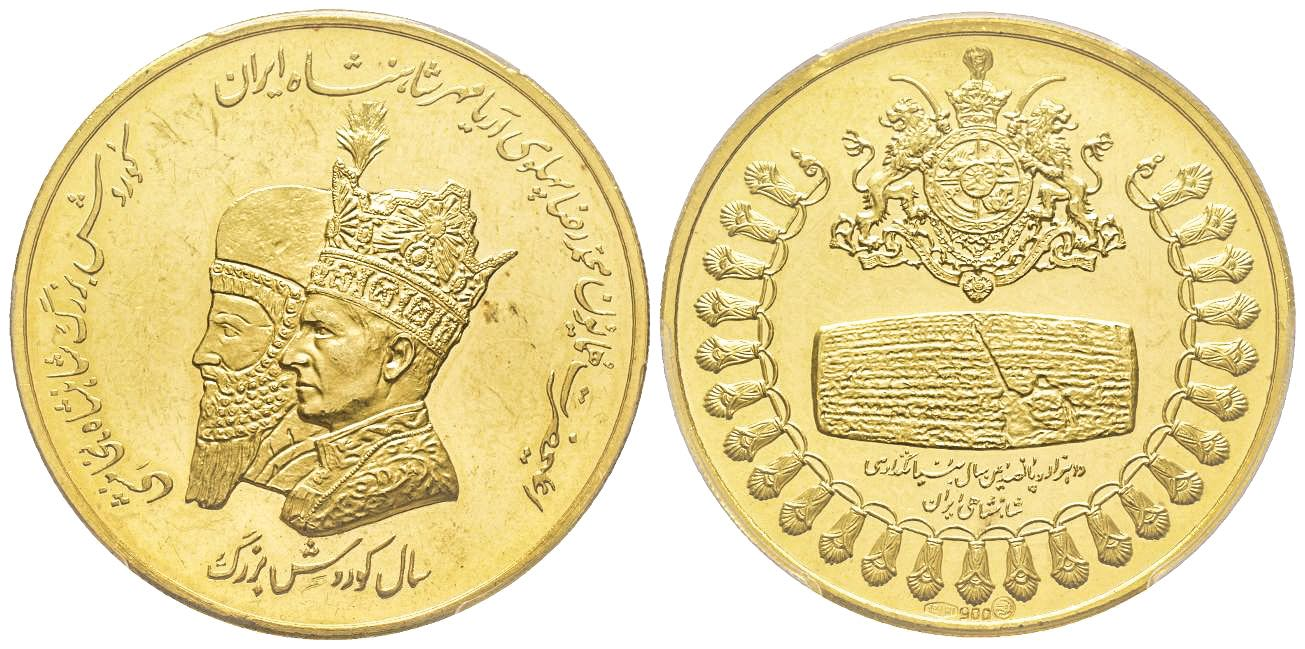
Jugate of Cyrus the Great and Mohammad Reza Pahlavi

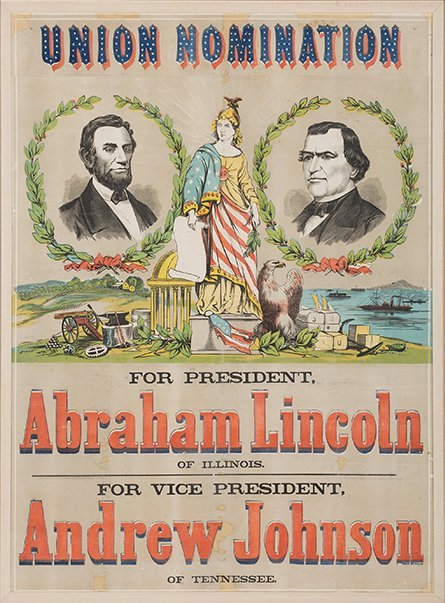
Lincoln & Johnson Campaign Poster, 1864

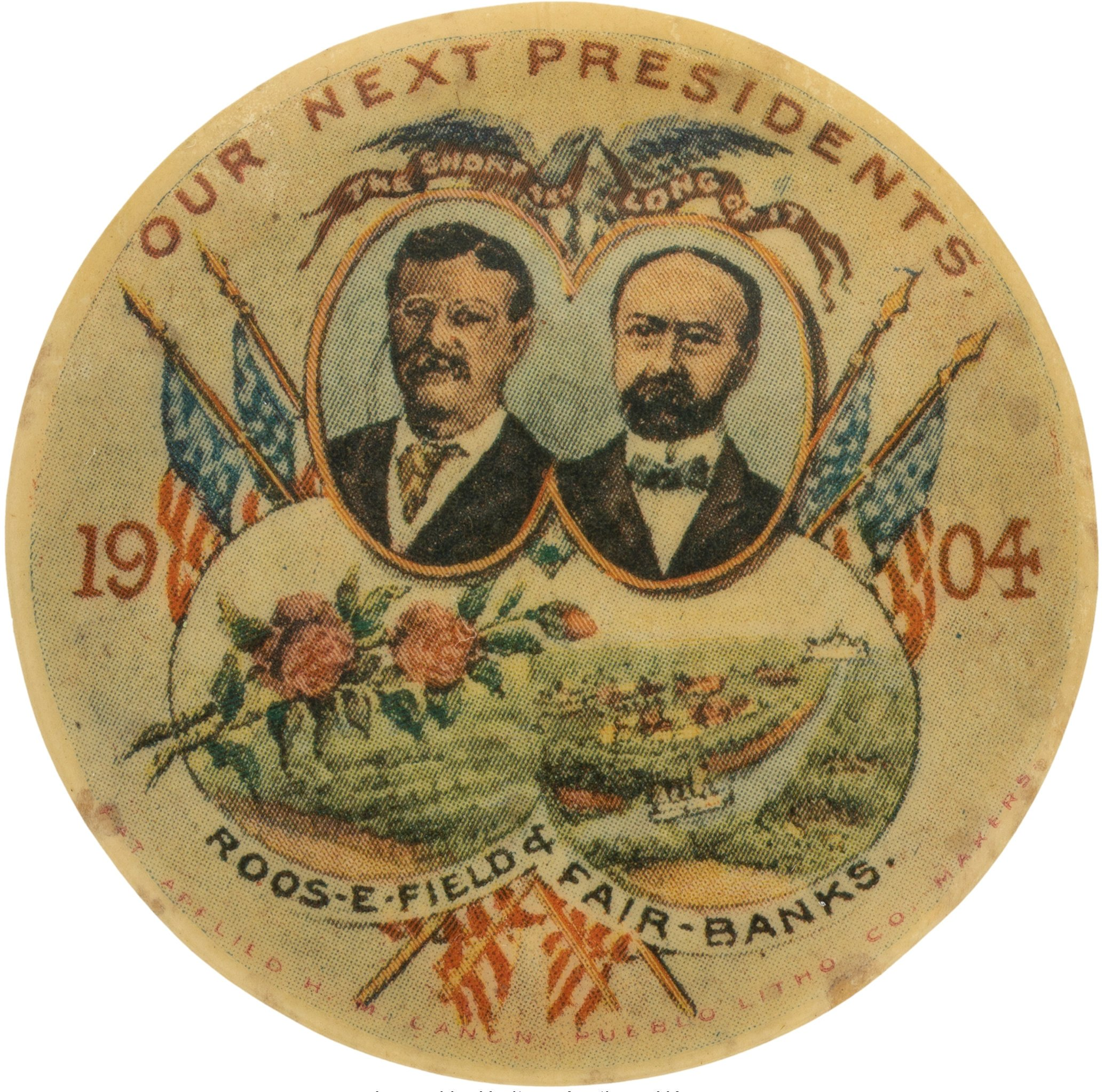
Roosevelt & Fairbanks Campaign Button, 1904
