= Walloon church =

French-speaking Reformed churches in the Netherlands

Walloon churches
- Église wallonne
- Classification: Protestant
- Orientation: Reformed
- Polity: Synodal
- Associations: Protestant Church in the Netherlands
- Origin: Late 16th century Dutch Republic
- Congregations: c. 12

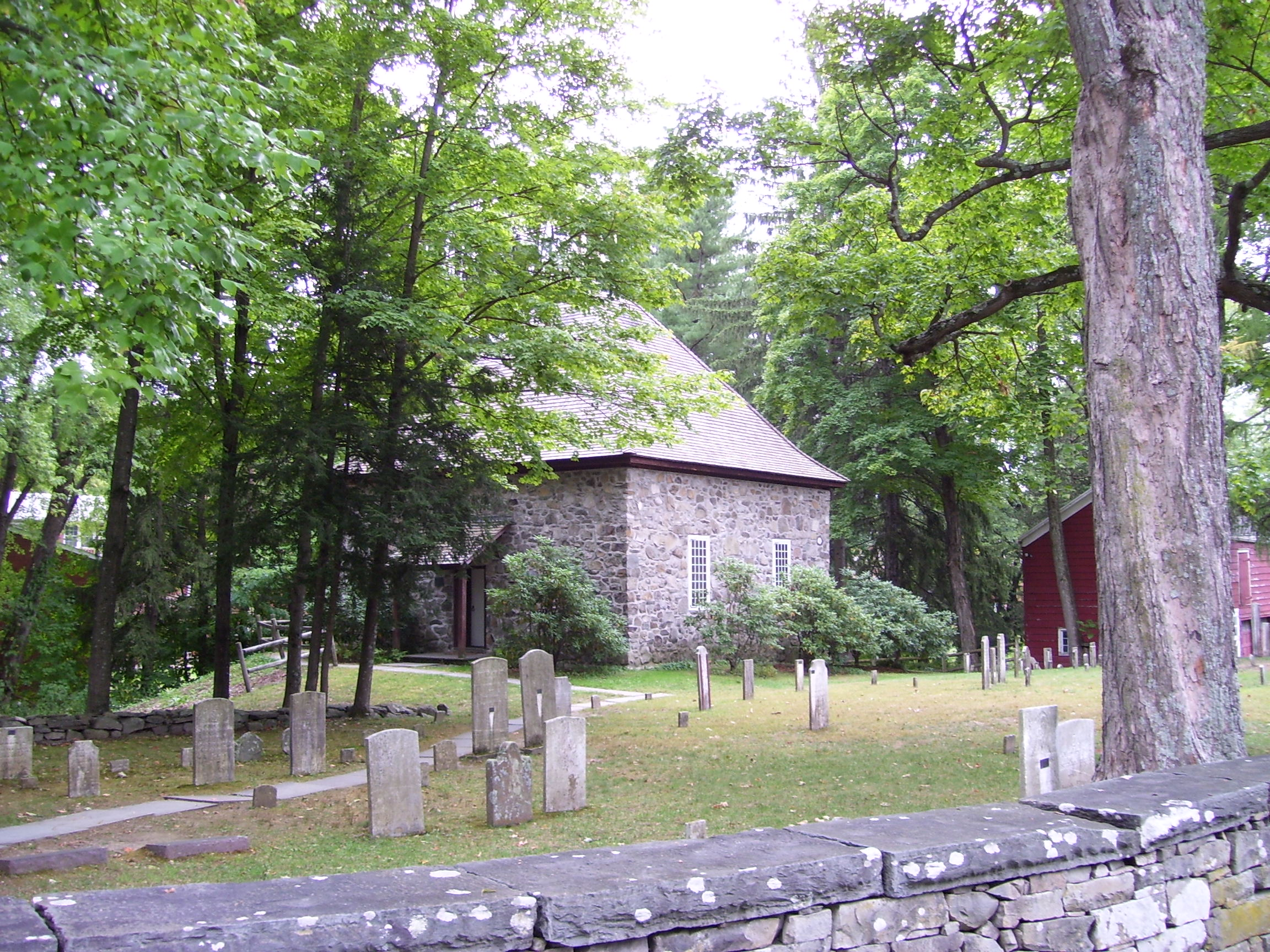
Reconstructed Walloon church in New Paltz, New York, once part of New Netherland

A Walloon church (French: Église wallonne; Dutch: Waalse kerk) is a Dutch Reformed congregation in the Netherlands distinguished by the fact that its congregants are French-speaking and originating from southern Low Countries (Wallonia and Brabant) and from France itself (Picardy and French Flanders, also descendants of Huguenots who fled from elsewhere). The Walloon churches differ from the Dutch-speaking Reformed congregations mainly in using French in worship and the Geneva Catechism rather than the Heidelberg Catechism.

The first Walloon congregations arose in the Dutch Republic in the late 16th century, formed by Calvinist refugees from the Southern Netherlands (in what is now Belgium) and northern France whose language was French. Many Huguenot refugees joined them after the revocation of the Edict of Nantes in 1685, sharing the French language and Calvinism. Of some 600 French pastors who went into exile, about 400 reached the United Provinces, roughly half of whom were taken on by the Walloon synod.

== Organisation ==
The Walloon churches joined the Dutch Reformed Church and were organised within it as a Walloon Synod (Synode wallon). After 1815 their status was reduced to that of a provincial synod, the Réunion wallonne, and after 1951 to a single classis, with the Commission wallonne as its executive. The congregations now form part of the Protestant Church in the Netherlands and belong to its classis of North Brabant, Limburg and the Réunion wallonne. At its height the community had 43 congregations; about a dozen remain active.

== Bibliothèque wallonne ==
The Walloon churches maintain the Bibliothèque wallonne (Walloon Library), their combined archive and library. It began as a travelling church archive in 1578, became a fixed archive in 1777, was joined by a separate Walloon library in 1852, and took its present form when the two were merged in 1893. Originally kept in Leiden, the collection moved to Amsterdam in 1973 and since 1998 has been deposited at Leiden University Libraries. Among its holdings is the Fichier wallon, an index of names from the baptismal, marriage and burial registers of Walloon congregations up to 1811, which is widely used in genealogy.

== See also ==
- Walloons
- Walloon Church, Amsterdam
- Nieuwe Waalse Kerk
- St Agnes Convent, Arnhem
- Protestantism in Belgium
