= Norse-American Centennial =

1925 celebration in Minnesota, US

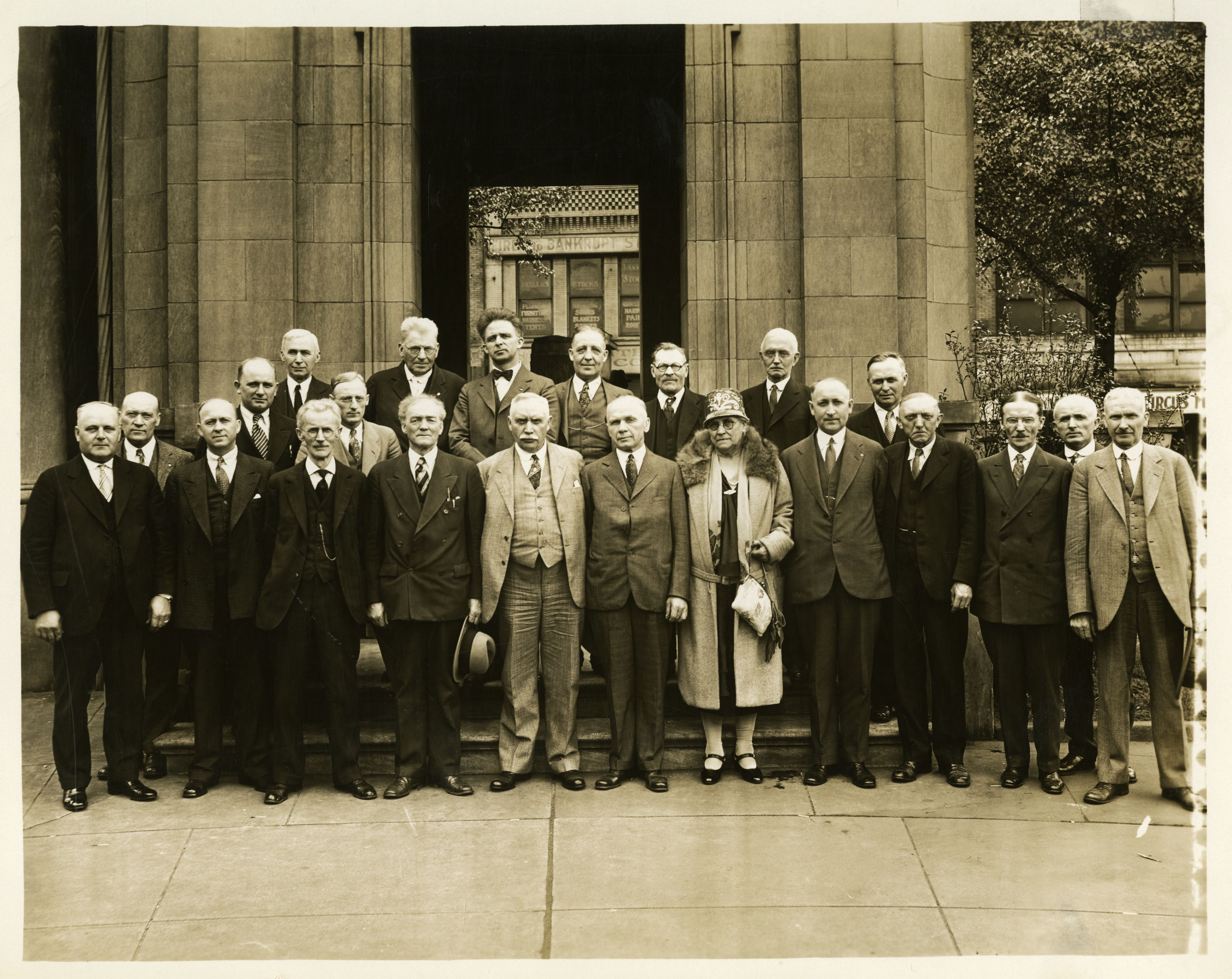
Group portrait of the Bygdelagenes Fellesaad during the Norse-American Centennial

The Norse-American Centennial celebration was held at the Minnesota State Fair Grounds in St. Paul, Minnesota, on June 6–9, 1925.

The centennial commemorated the 100th anniversary of organized Norwegian migration. In 1825, a sloop called the Restaurationen arrived in New York from Stavanger, Norway. According to the Norse-American Centennial souvenir booklet, “This was the first large group of people from Norway who came to make their homes in the new land of the free across the Atlantic. This event marks the beginning of the steady stream of immigration from Norway, a country which has sent to our land a larger proportion of her population than any other country with the exception of Ireland.”

The Bygdelags played an important part in the planning of the Norse-American Centennial. On Saturday, June 6, the Bygdelags held their annual meetings (stevner) at the State Fair Grounds.

== Norse-American Centennial Organizational Committees ==
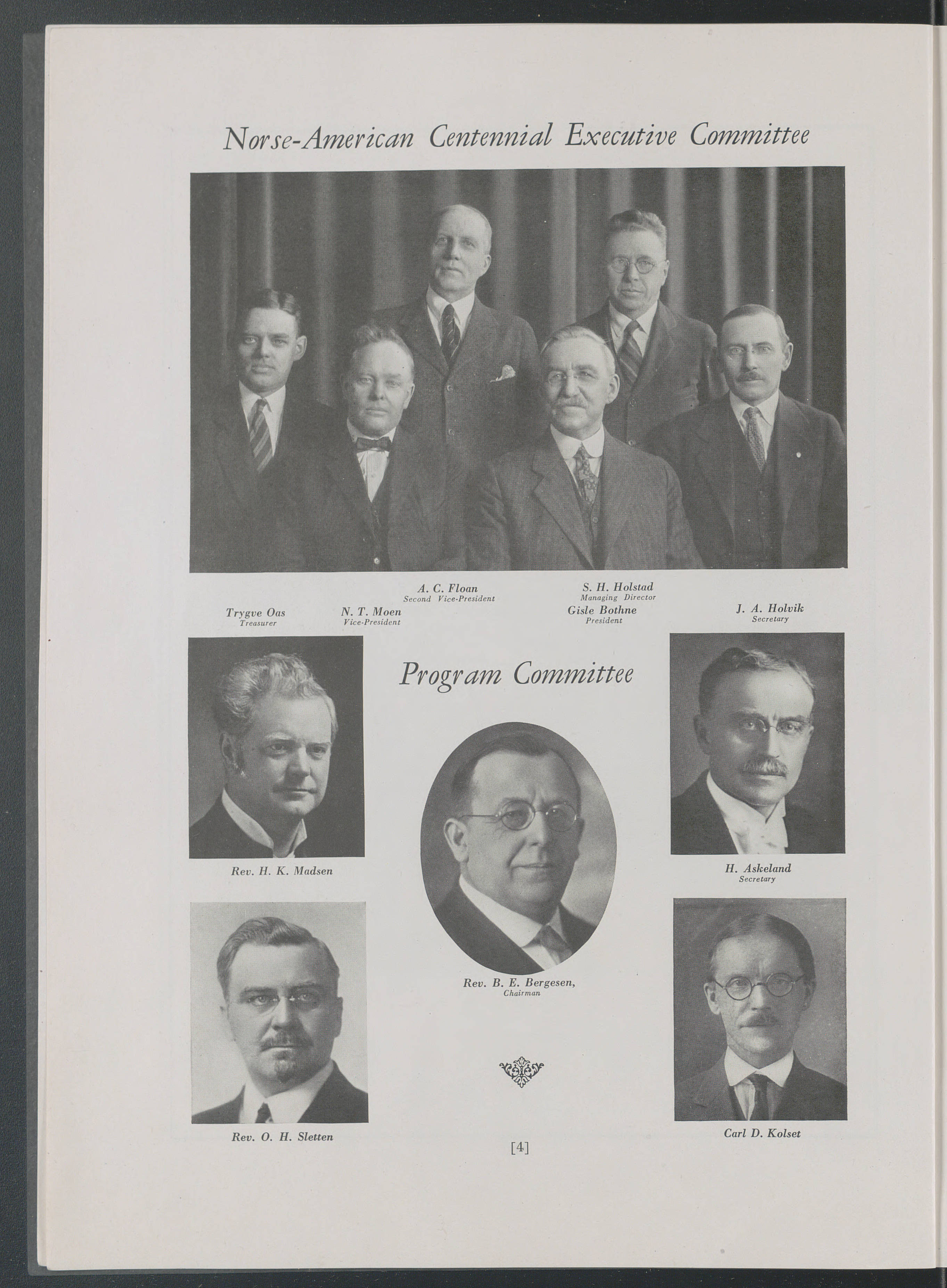
Executive and Program Committee, Norse-American Centennial Souvenir booklet.

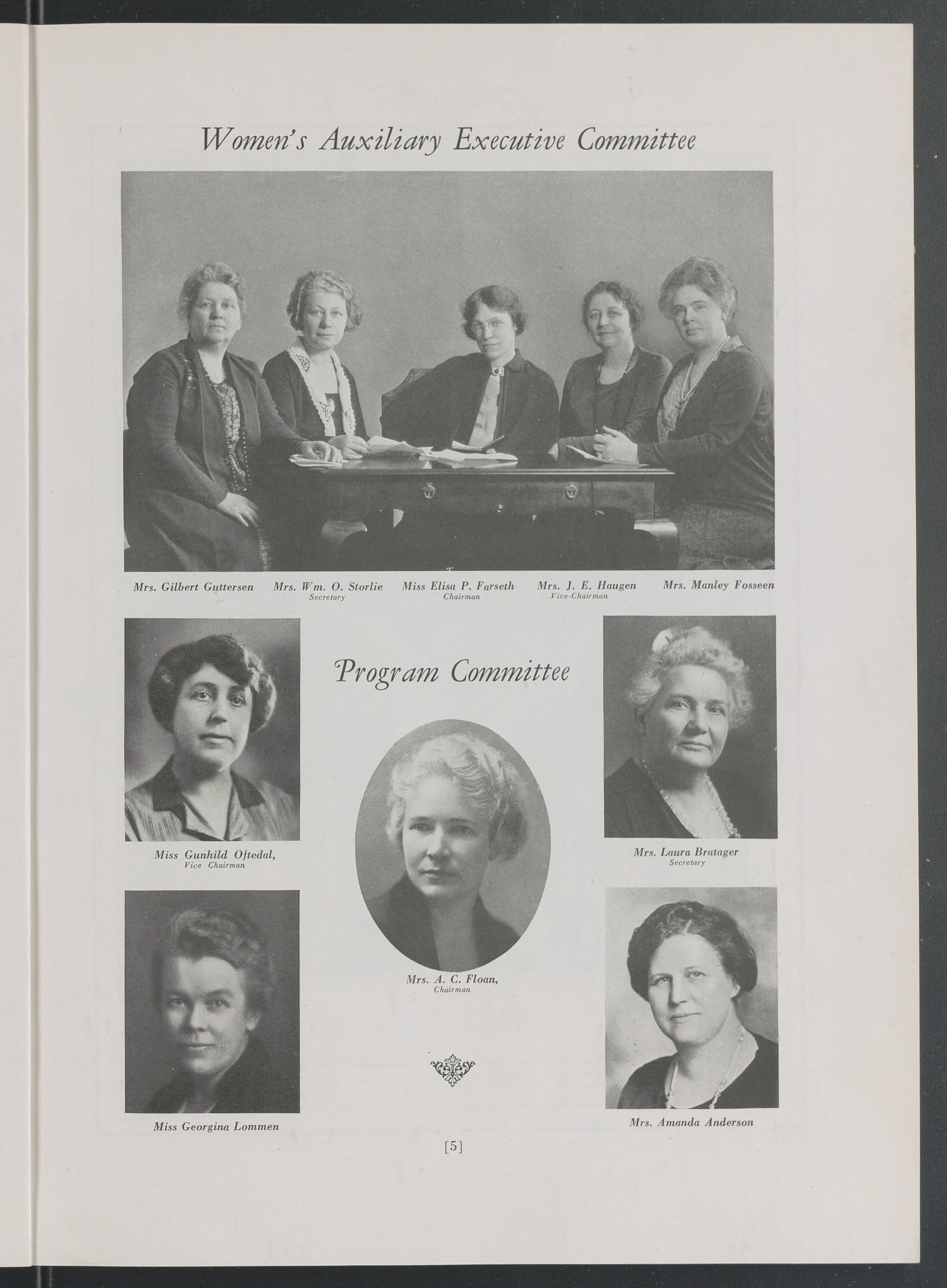
Women's Auxiliary Executive and Program Committee, Norse-American Centennial souvenir booklet.

Executive Committee:

- Gisle Bothne (President)
- A.C. Floan (Second Vice-President)
- N.T. Moen (Vice-President)
- Sigurd H. Holstad (Managing Director)
- Trygve Oas (Treasurer)
- J.A. Holvik (Secretary)

Program Committee:

- Rev. B.E. Bergesen (Chairman)
- H. Askeland (Secretary)
- Rev. H.K. Madsen
- Rev. O.H. Sletten
- Carl D. Kolset

Women’s Auxiliary Executive Committee:

- Mrs. Gilbert Guttersen
- Mrs. William O. Storlie (Secretary)
- Elisa P. Farseth (Chairman)
- Mrs. J.E. Haugen (Vice-Chairman)
- Mrs. Manley Fossen

Women’s Program Committee:

- Mrs. A.C. Floan (Chairman)
- Gunhild Oftedal (Vice Chairman)
- Laura Bratager (Secretary)
- Georgian Lommen
- Amanda Anderson

== Centennial Events ==
During the Centennial, speeches and musical performances were scattered throughout the program. The Sunday events included speeches from H.G. Stub, Bishop John Lunde, Gisle Bothne, and Governor Theodore Christianson. The St. Olaf Choir and Luther College Band performed musical arrangements.

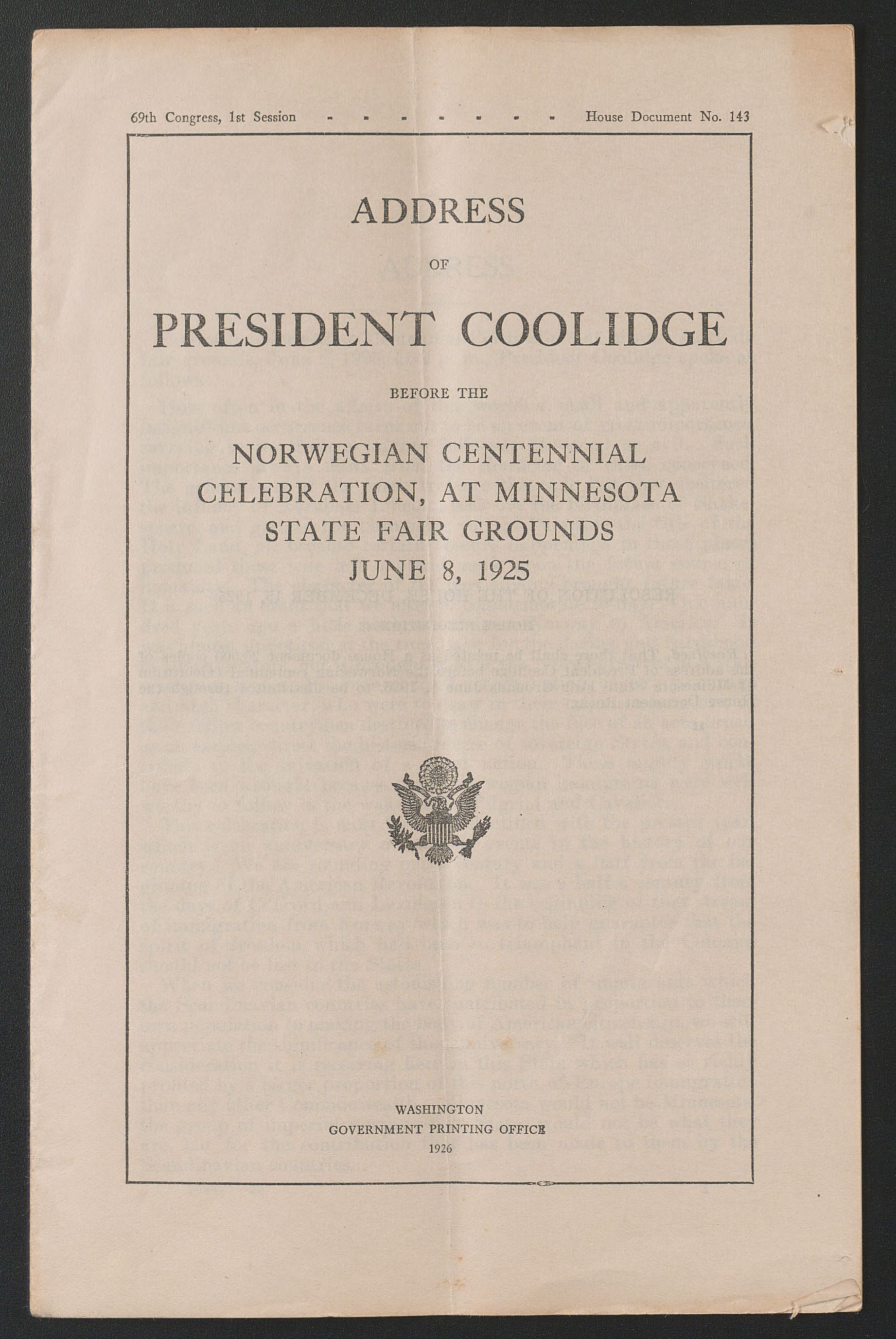
Address of President Coolidge before the Norwegian Centennial celebration.

Monday’s events included numerous speeches prior to the culmination of Calvin Coolidge’s speech. Speeches were given by Lars Oftedal, Ole Rølvaag, Theodore Blegen, Olaf M. Norlie, and Norwegian-American politicians like Peter Norbeck and Henrik Shipstead. The Concordia Choir also performed that day.

Calvin Coolidge celebrated the achievements of Norwegians in America and their place in American society. In the final lines of Coolidge’s speech, he states, “When I look upon you and realize what you are and what you have done, I know that in your hands our country is secure. You have laid up your treasure in what America represents, and there will your heart be also. You have given your pledge to the Land of the Free. The pledge of the Norwegian people has never yet gone unredeemed.”

Tuesday’s events included more speeches from other Scandinavian-American groups, the Women’s Auxilary Committee, Marie Michelet, Gertrude Hilleboe, and Mrs. William O. Storlie. The Centennial concluded with The Pageant of the Northman, which featured 1,500 performers and focused on Norwegian migration to the Midwest.

== Norse-American Stamp and Medal ==
A centennial medal and stamp were created for the commemoration of the event. The medal was designed by James Earle Fraser (sculptor). It shows imagery of a Viking ship and a man setting foot on American soil with the following inscription: "Norse-American Centennial, 1825-1925." The Post Office Department also issued two Norse-American Centennial stamps. The two-cent in read and black bears the sloop, Restaurationen. " The five-cent in blue and black bears a design of a viking ship.

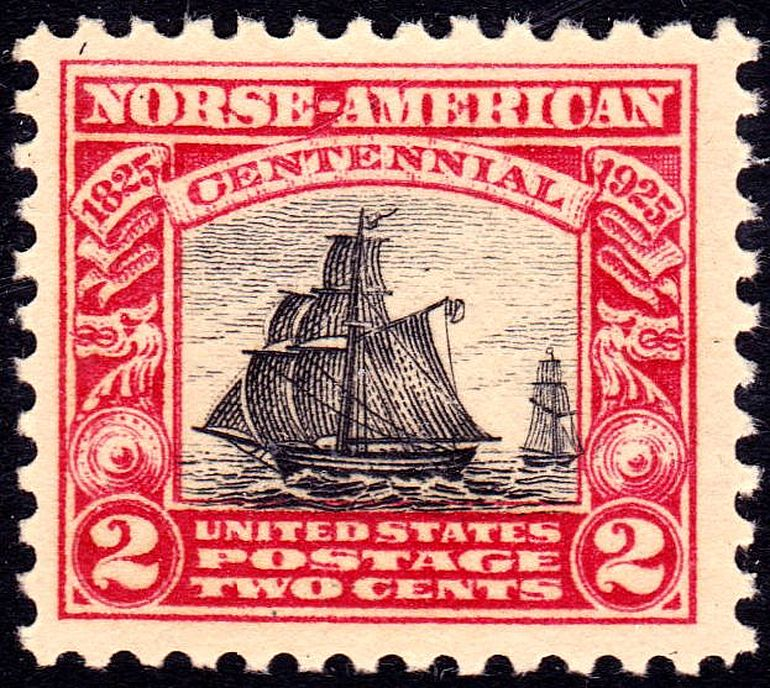
Two-cent Norse-American Centennial stamp.

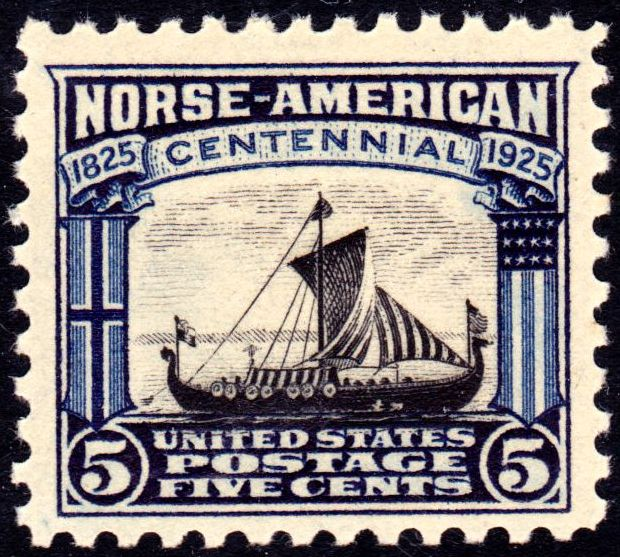
Five-cent Norse-American Centennial stamp.

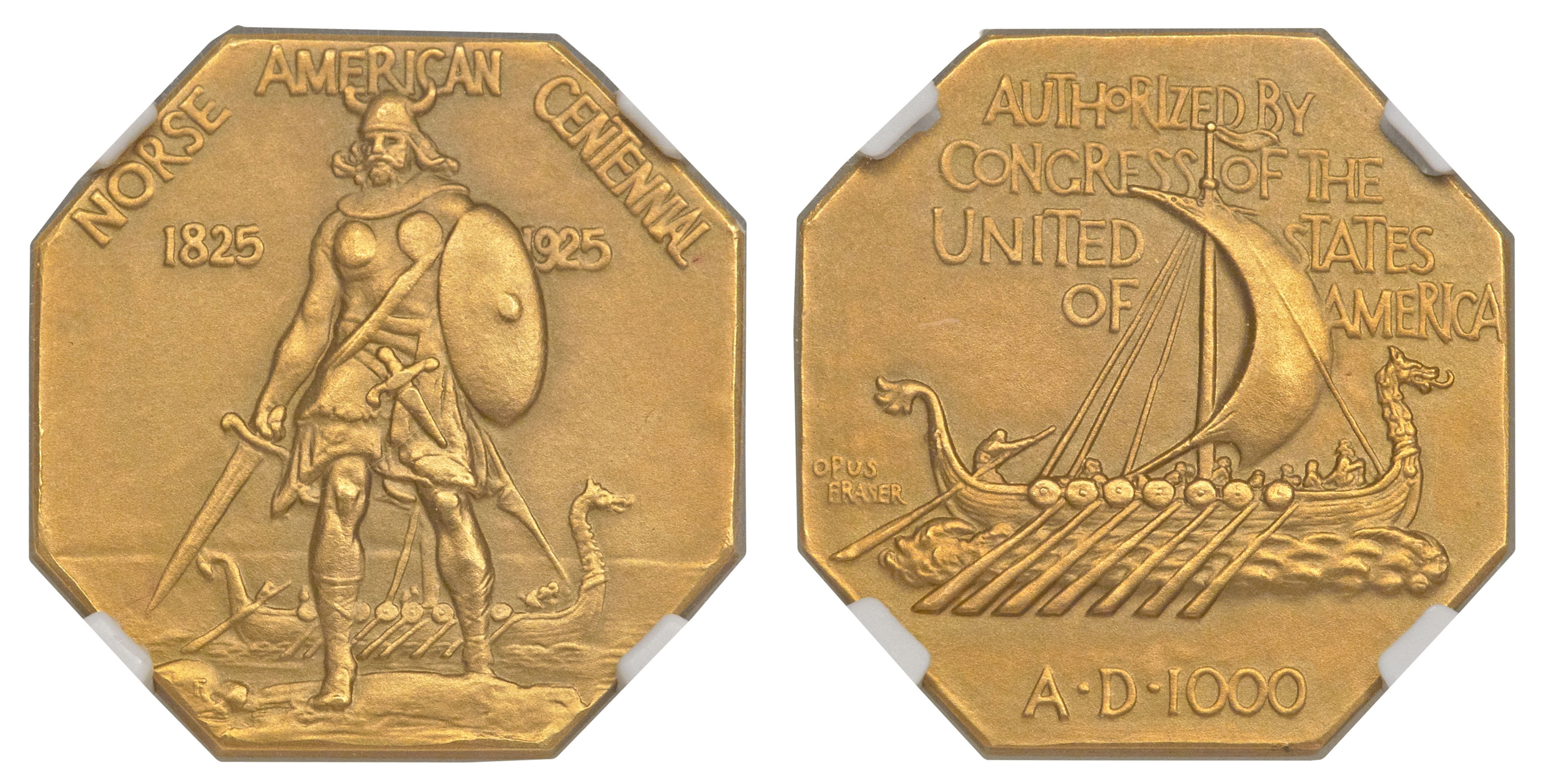
Norse-American Centennial medal.
