= Antiochus XI Epiphanes =

King of Syria from 94 to 93 BC

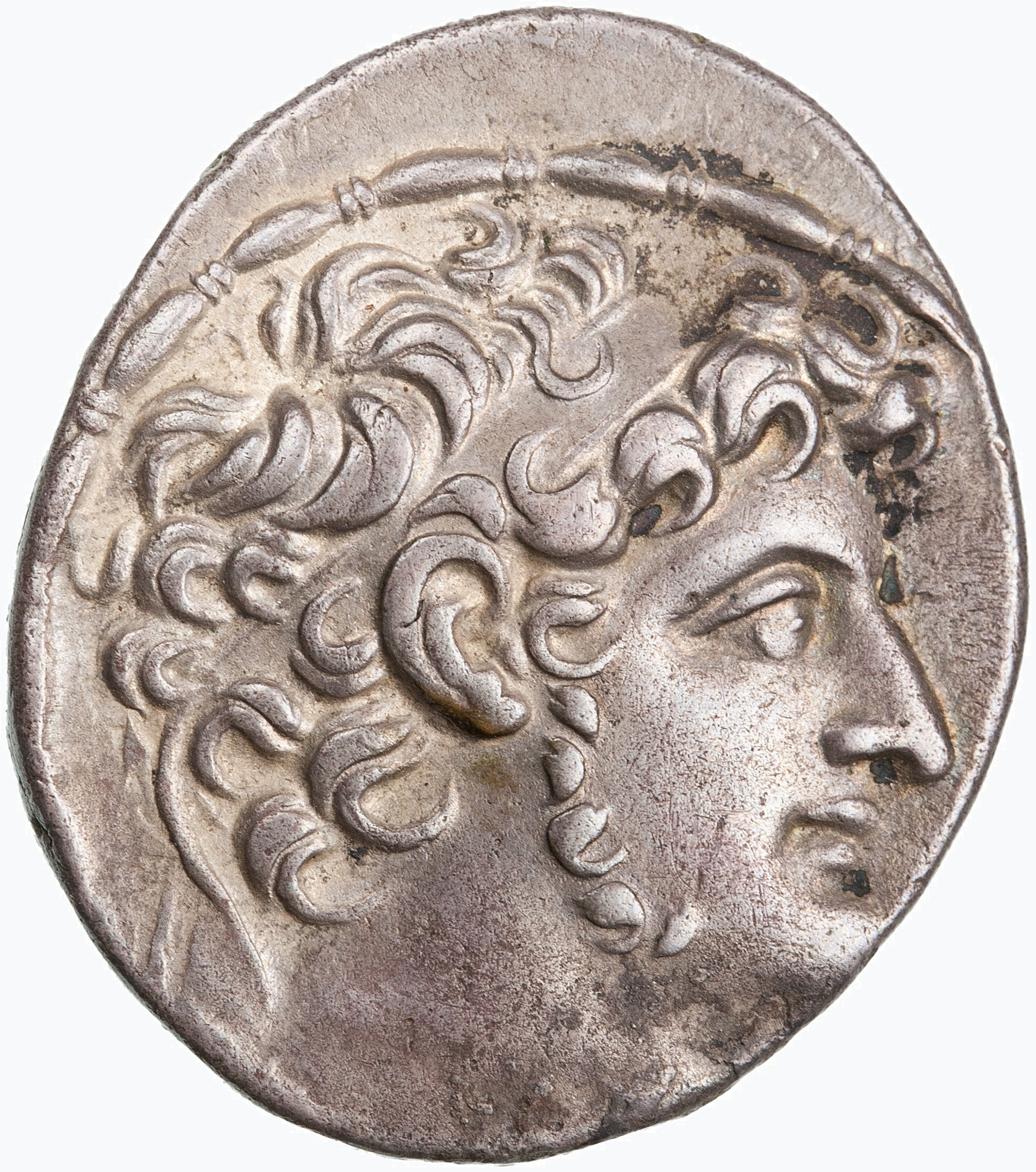
- Antiochus XI's portrait on the obverse of a tetradrachm

King of Syria
- Reign: 94–93 BC
- Predecessors: Seleucus VI, Demetrius III, Antiochus X
- Successors: Demetrius III, Antiochus X, Philip I
- Co-ruler: Philip I
- Contenders: Antiochus X; Demetrius III
- Born: between 124 and 109 BC
- Died: 93 BC; Antioch (modern-day Antakya, Hatay, Turkey)
- Dynasty: Seleucid
- Father: Antiochus VIII
- Mother: Tryphaena

Antiochus XI Epiphanes Philadelphus (Greek: Ἀντίοχος Ἐπιφανής Φιλάδελφος; died 93 BC) was a Seleucid monarch who reigned as King of Syria between 94 and 93 BC, during the late Hellenistic period. The son of King Antiochus VIII, he ascended the throne after his elder brother Seleucus VI was driven to his death in 94 BC by their cousin Antiochus X. Antiochus XI declared himself king jointly with his twin brother Philip I. Dubious ancient accounts, which may be contradicted by archaeological evidence, report that Antiochus XI's first act was to avenge his late brother by destroying Mopsuestia in Cilicia, the city responsible for Seleucus VI's death. In 93 BC, Antiochus XI took the Syrian capital Antioch, an event not mentioned by ancient historians but confirmed through numismatic evidence. Antiochus XI appears to have been the senior king, minting coinage as a sole king and reigning alone in the capital, while Philip I remained in Cilicia but kept his royal title. Antiochus XI may have restored the temple of Apollo and Artemis in Daphne, but his reign did not last long. In the autumn of the same year, Antiochus X regrouped and counter-attacked; Antiochus XI was defeated and drowned in the Orontes River as he tried to flee.

== Name, family and early life ==
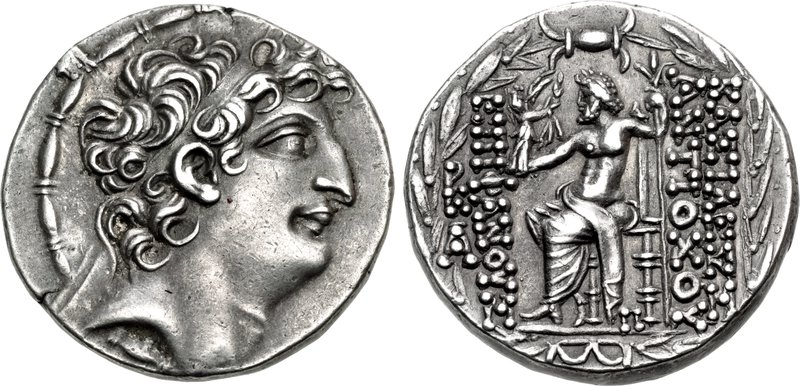
Coin of Antiochus VIII, father of Antiochus XI

The name Antiochus is of Greek etymology and means "resolute in contention". The capital of Syria, Antioch, was named after Antiochus, father of the city's founder, King Seleucus I (reigned 305–281 BC); this name became dynastic and many Seleucid kings bore it. In c. 124 BC Antiochus VIII married the Ptolemaic princess Tryphaena, who died in 109 BC. The couple had many children, including Seleucus VI, the eldest; Antiochus XI and Philip I; their younger brother Demetrius III; and the youngest Antiochus XII. The mother of Philip I was mentioned explicitly as Tryphaena by the fourth-century historian Eusebius, who also mentioned that Antiochus XI and Philip I were twins (didymoi). Antiochus XI's date of birth is unknown, but by the time he came to power he was at least in his twenties.

In 113 BC, Antiochus IX declared himself king and started a civil war against his half-brother Antiochus VIII. The conflict between the brothers would last a decade and a half; it claimed the life of Tryphaena and ended with the assassination of Antiochus VIII at the hands of his minister Herakleon of Beroia in 96 BC. In the aftermath of Antiochus VIII's death, Antiochus IX took the capital Antioch and married Antiochus VIII's second wife and widow, Cleopatra Selene. The sons of Antiochus VIII responded; Demetrius III took Damascus and ruled it, while Seleucus VI killed Antiochus IX in 95 BC and took Antioch. The new king was defeated by Antiochus IX's son Antiochus X (r. 95–92/88 BC), who took the capital. Seleucus VI escaped to Mopsuestia in Cilicia where he was killed by rebels in 94 BC.

== Reign ==
Syria in 95 BC

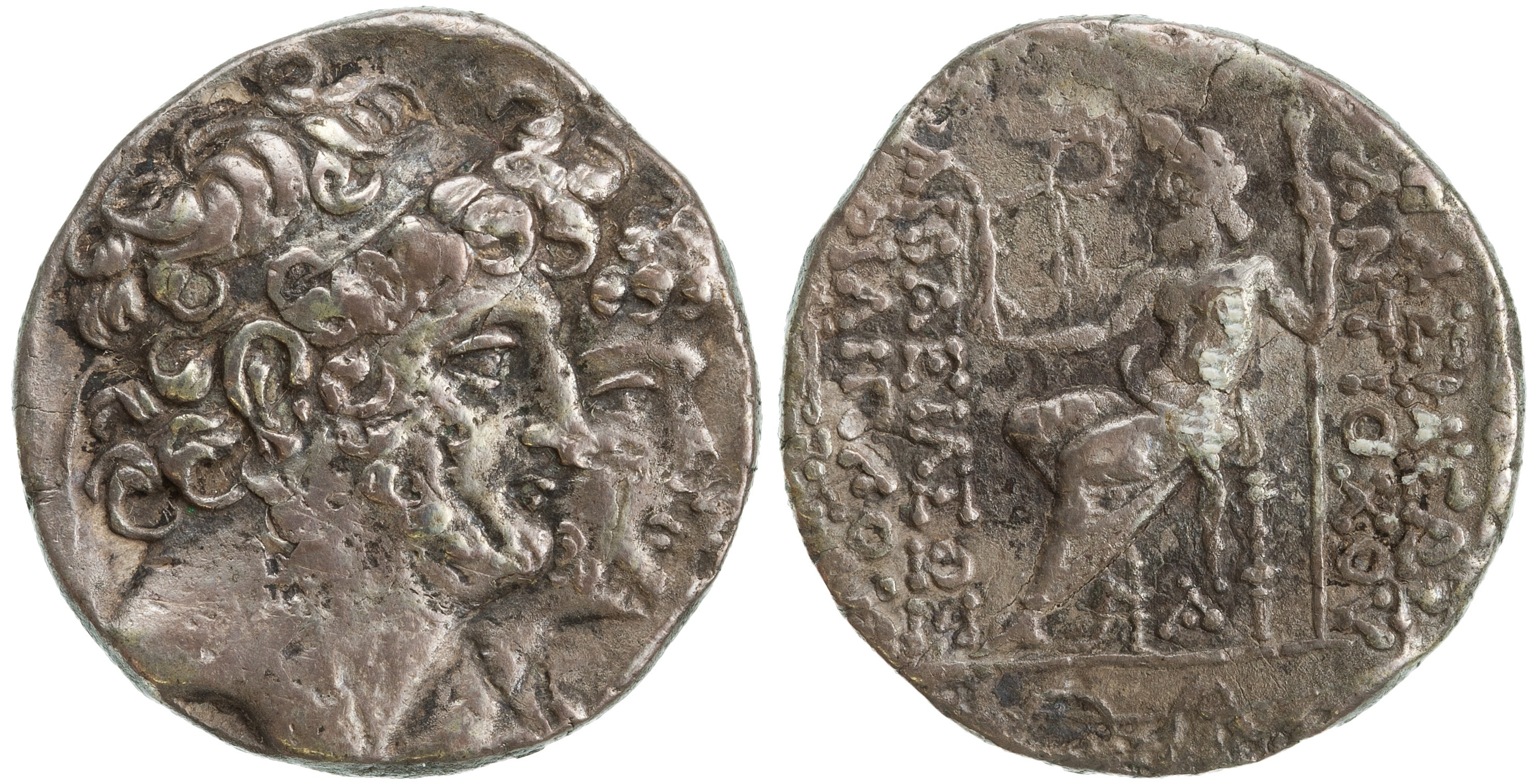
Antiochus XI and Philip I bearded

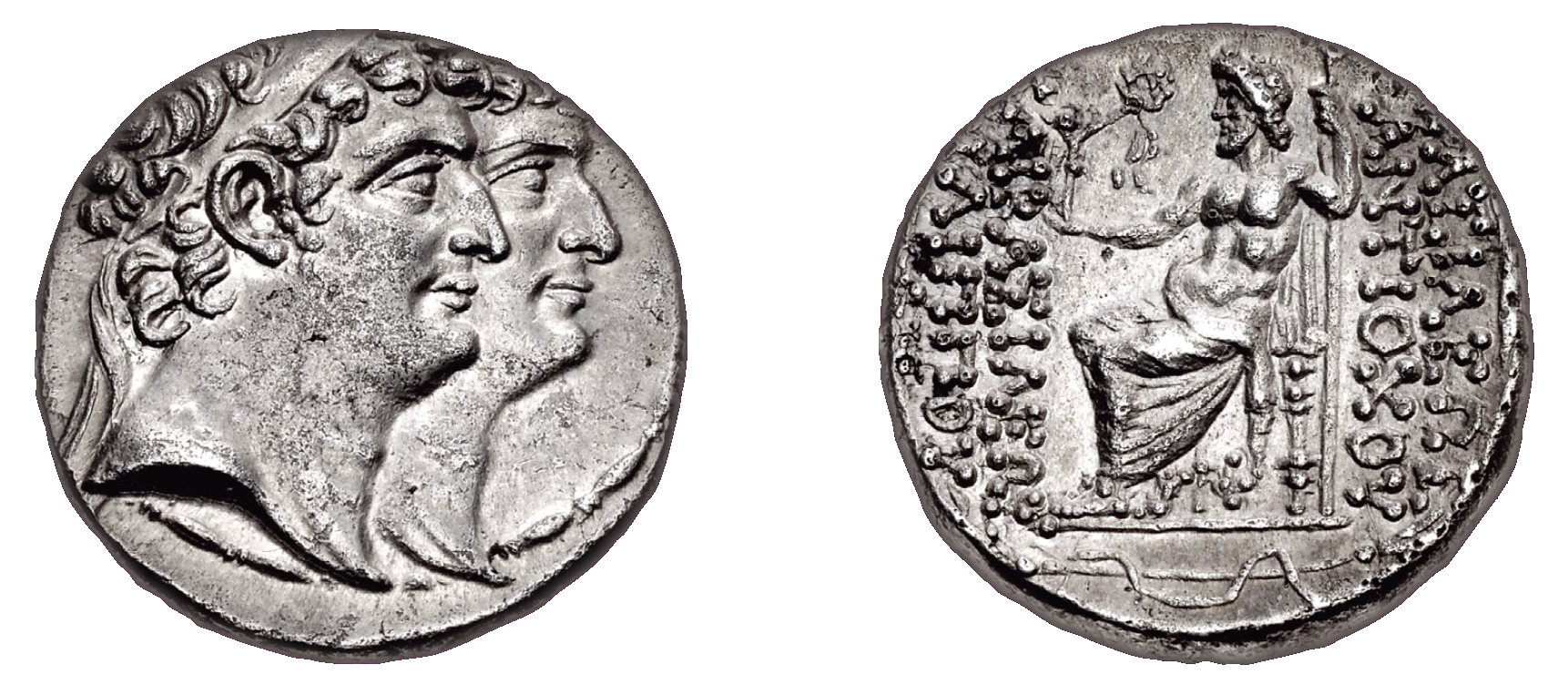
Jugate coin of Antiochus XI and Philip I. Antiochus XI is depicted with a sideburn.

The reigns of the late Seleucid kings are poorly attested in ancient literature through brief passages and summaries, often riddled with conflations and contradictions; the numismatic evidence is therefore the primary source when reconstructing the reigns of late Seleucid monarchs. During Seleucus VI's reign, Antiochus XI and his twin probably resided in Cilicia. In the aftermath of Seleucus VI's death, Antiochus XI and Philip I declared themselves kings in 94 BC; the historian Alfred Bellinger suggested that their base was a coastal city north of Antioch, while Arthur Houghton believed it was Beroea, because the city's rulers were Philip I's allies.

It is more likely that Tarsus was the main base of operations; both Antiochus XI and Philip I's portraits appeared on the obverses of jugate coins they struck, and all the jugate coins were minted in Cilicia. Three series of jugate coins are known; as of 2008, one series has six known surviving specimens, depicting both kings with beards. The excellent craftsmanship of the portraits depicted on the coins of the six specimen series indicates that the minting facility was located in a city that was a center of culture, making Tarsus the likely site of the mint and so the probable base of operations.

The other two coin series have fewer surviving specimens and depict Antiochus XI with a sideburn. Those coins were not minted in Tarsus, and the sideburn indicates that those issues were produced by cities west of the main base, as the king passed them on his way to Tarsus; by the time Antiochus XI arrived at his headquarters, he was depicted with a full beard. On all jugate coins, Antiochus XI was portrayed in front of Philip I, his name taking precedence, showing that he was the senior monarch. According to Josephus, Antiochus XI became king before Philip I, but the numismatic evidence suggests otherwise, as the earliest coins show both brothers ruling jointly.

=== Epithets and royal image ===
Hellenistic monarchs did not use regnal numbers but usually employed epithets to distinguish themselves from other kings with similar names; the numbering of kings is mostly a modern practice. On his coins, Antiochus XI appeared with the epithets Epiphanes (God Manifest) and Philadelphus (Brother-Loving). Epiphanes served to emphasize Antiochus XI's paternity as a son of Antiochus VIII, who bore the same epithet; while Philadelphus was probably a sign of respect to Seleucus VI and Philip I. (Note: The historian Alfred von Gutschmid suggested that whenever a Hellenistic king assumed the epithet Philadelphus, it meant that he had been asked by his reigning brother to share the throne. In the case of Antiochus XI and Philip I, since both used the epithet, von Gutschmid considered it an exception of the rule. He suggested that the brothers assumed their epithet to legitimize their claim to the throne, which was contested by the line of Antiochus IX, by emphasizing their relation to their brother, the former king Seleucus VI. Von Gutschmid's arguments were criticized by many scholars, especially Evaristo Breccia, who considered the epithet a homage to Seleucus VI and an affirmation of the fraternal concord between Antiochus XI and Philip I.) The beard sported by Antiochus XI on his jugate coins from Tarsus is probably a sign of mourning and the intention to avenge Seleucus VI's death. The last issue of Antiochus XI from Antioch depicts him beardless, highlighting that the vow was fulfilled.

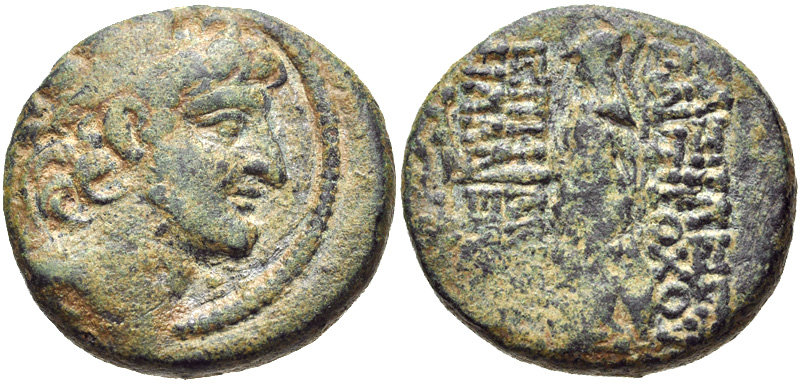
Portrait of Antiochus XI exemplifying the tryphé tradition

Drawing his legitimacy from his father, Antiochus XI appeared on his coinage with an exaggerated hawked nose, in the likeness of Antiochus VIII. The iconography of Antiochus XI's portrait was part of the tryphé-king tradition, heavily used by Antiochus VIII. (Note: An engraved gem is kept by the Museum of Fine Arts, Boston. Its accession number is 13.244. Its style resembles the style used for Antiochus XI's portraits; the gem could be depicting him, or his brother Demetrius III. Such portraits on intaglios served a function parallel but different from the portraits depicted on coins. Both portraits emphasized the characters of the monarch they depicted, but while coin portraits were means of guaranteeing value and genuineness, and thus followed standardized models, aimed at delivering a political message of continuity which signified the king's dynastic connections and his prowess as a monarch, gem portraits did not follow the standards used for coinage, and served a more private purpose, depicting the ruler in a more delicate manner. Gems bearing royal portraits and cut under direct royal auspice served many functions; they were probably used as personal gifts to followers and foreign ambassadors, and bearers of royal intaglios indicated their loyalty to the king, or his memory, by using his portrait as their signet.) The ruler's portrait express tryphé (luxury and magnificence), where his unattractive features and stoutness are emphasized. (Note: Gluttony and corpulence were a sign of a monarch's wealth in Hellenistic art. Many kings were depicted with double chins and fleshy faces.) The tradition of tryphé images started in Egypt, and was later adopted in Syria. The Romans considered the tryphé portraits as evidence of the degeneracy and decadence of Hellenistic kings; the softness depicted in the portraits was seen as a sign of the rulers' incompetence, a way to explain the decline of the Hellenistic dynasties. However, the Roman view is not factual; those images were an intentional policy in a kingdom ravaged by civil war. Most late Seleucid monarchs, including Antiochus XI, spent their reigns fighting, causing havoc in their lands. The image of a warrior king on coins, as was customary for Hellenistic Bactrian kings for example, would have alienated the already impoverished population suffering the consequences of war. The people needed peace and copiousness, and the tryphé portrait was an attempt to imply that the king and his people were living a pleasurable life. By employing the tryphé image, Antiochus XI suggested that he would be a successful and popular king like his father. (Note: Evidence that the Roman conception of the meaning of tryphé portraits was incorrect, includes the iconography of Seleucia Pieria's Tyche (tutelary deity) during the reign of Antiochus VIII. The goddess's features resemble those of the king. If tryphé was a sign of degeneration, then it would have never been used to portray a deity.)

=== Avenging Seleucus VI and taking the capital ===
According to Eusebius, the brothers sacked Mopsuestia and destroyed it to avenge Seleucus VI. Eusebius's statement is doubtful because in 86 BC, Rome conferred inviolability upon the cult of Isis and Sarapis in Mopsuestia, which is proven by an inscription from the city. After Mopsuestia, Antiochus XI left Philip I in Cilicia and advanced on Antioch, driving Antiochus X from the city at the beginning of 93 BC. (Note: Eusebius stated that both brothers marched on Antioch, while the first century historian Josephus mentioned only Antiochus XI; the latter account is more accurate and is supported by numismatic evidence.) Ancient historians do not note Antiochus XI's reign in the capital, stating that he fought against Antiochus X and was defeated. The 6th-century Byzantine monk and historian John Malalas, whose work is considered generally unreliable by scholars, mentions the reign of Antiochus XI in his account of the Roman period in Antioch. The material evidence for Antiochus XI's success in taking the capital was provided in 1912, when an account of a coin struck by him in Antioch was published.

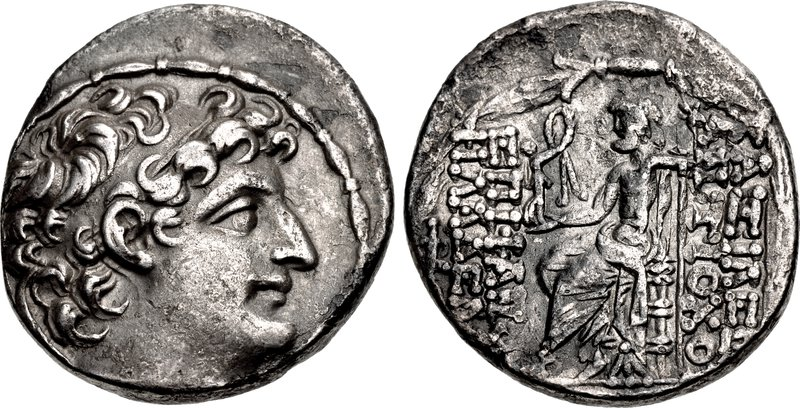
Tetradrachm of Antiochus XI, Antioch mint

Philip I did not take residence in the capital and Antiochus XI minted coinage as a sole king. (Note: The numismatist Arthur Houghton attributed a jugate coin of Antiochus XI and Philip I to Antioch, but later retracted the attribution in favour of a Cilician mint.) Philip I kept the royal title while remaining in the city which was his base during the preparations to avenge Seleucus VI. The numismatist Edward Theodore Newell assigned Antiochus XI a reign of a few weeks in the capital, but according to the numismatist Oliver Hoover, estimating the average annual die usage rate of the King suggests a reign of several months. (Note: The estimation is conducted using the Esty formula, which was developed by the mathematician Warren W. Esty; it is a mathematical formula that can calculate the relative number of obverse dies used to produce a certain coin series. The calculation can be used to measure the coinage production of a certain king and thus estimate the length of his reign.) According to Malalas, King Antiochus Philadelphus, i.e. Antiochus XI, (Note: This epithet was also used by King Antiochus XIII (r. 82–64 BC), who had the distinction of being the last Seleucid king, after whose death Rome annexed Syria. Malalas used the epithet "Dionysus" when referring to Antiochus XIII, which was in fact an epithet of Antiochus XII, who never controlled Antioch. According to the historian Glanville Downey, the Byzantine historian conflated Antiochus XIII with Antiochus XII, and used the epithet "Philadelphus" when referring to Antiochus XI.) built a temple for Apollo and Artemis in Daphne, and set up two golden statues representing the gods, as well as conferring the right of asylum to anyone who took refuge in the temple; this statement cannot be correct since the temple was attested during the time of Antiochus III (r. 222–187 BC). The historian Glanville Downey, observing Malalas's writing style in Greek, suggested that by "building", Malalas meant renovating or restoring, which indicates that a predecessor of Antiochus XI may have desecrated the temple and melted down the golden statues. (Note: The second-century theologian Clement of Alexandria (fl. 200 AD) reported that Antiochus IX melted a statue of Zeus, making him a candidate for the monarch who melted the statues of Apollo and Artemis. On the other hand, Clement of Alexandria might have misread the accounts of the first-century BC historians Diodorus Siculus or Trogus, who both reported the sacrilege of Zeus's statue by Alexander II.)

== End and succession ==
By autumn 93 BC, Antiochus X counter-attacked, defeating Antiochus XI, who drowned in the Orontes River as he tried to flee. Ancient accounts dealing with the last battle differ: according to the first-century historian Josephus, Antiochus XI fought alone, while Eusebius has both Antiochus XI and Philip I in the battle. Eusebius failed to note the reign of Antiochus XI in Antioch, stating that the final battle took place immediately after the destruction of Mopsuestia; a statement contradicted by numismatic evidence. In the view of Bellinger, the brothers' combined armies must have been deployed, but since only Antiochus XI perished, it is probable that Philip I stayed behind at his capital with Antiochus XI leading the armies in the field.

Nothing is known regarding Antiochus XI's marriages or children. According to the first century biographer Plutarch, the first-century BC Roman general Lucullus said that the Armenian king, Tigranes II, who conquered Syria in 83 BC, "put to death the successors of Seleucus, and [carried] off their wives and daughters into captivity". Ancient sources regarding the late Seleucid period are fragmentary and do not mention many details. Therefore, the statement of Lucullus makes it possible that a wife or daughters of Antiochus XI existed, and that they were taken by the Armenian king. Following his victory, Antiochus X regained the capital and ruled it until his death.

== Family tree ==
Family tree of Antiochus XI

Seleucus IV (Note: Hoover 2000, p. 107) | Laodice IV (Note: Hoover 2000, p. 108) | Ptolemy V | Cleopatra I
Demetrius I | Laodice V | Ptolemy VI | Cleopatra II
Demetrius II (Note: Wright 2012, p. iii) | Cleopatra Thea (Note: Ogden 1999, p. 149) | Cleopatra III | Ptolemy VIII
Antiochus VIII | Tryphaena
Antiochus XI

Citations:

== See also ==
- List of Syrian monarchs
- Timeline of Syrian history

== Notes ==
Antiochus XI Epiphanes Seleucid dynasty Born: Unknown Died: 93 BC
| Preceded by Seleucus VI; Demetrius III; Antiochus X | King of Syria; 94–93 BC with Demetrius III (94–93 BC); Antiochus X (94–93 BC); Philip I (94–93 BC) | Succeeded by Demetrius III; Antiochus X Philip I |
