= Philip I Philadelphus =

Seleucid King of Syria (r. 94–83/75 BC)

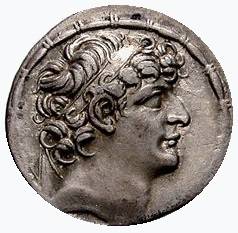
- Philip I's portrait on the obverse of a tetradrachm

King of Syria
- Reign: 94–83 or 75 BC
- Predecessors: Seleucus VI, Demetrius III, Antiochus X
- Successors: Antiochus XIII, Cleopatra Selene
- Co-ruler: Antiochus XI (94–93 BC)
- Contenders: Demetrius III (94–87 BC); Antiochus X (94–92/88 BC); Antiochus XII (87–82 BC)
- Born: between 124 and 109 BC
- Died: 83 or 75 BC
- Issue: Philip II
- Dynasty: Seleucid
- Father: Antiochus VIII
- Mother: Tryphaena

Philip I Epiphanes Philadelphus (Ancient Greek: Φίλιππος Ἐπιφανής Φιλάδελφος; between 124 and 109 BC–83 or 75 BC) was a Hellenistic Seleucid monarch who reigned as the king of Syria from 94 to either 83 or 75 BC. He was a son of King Antiochus VIII. He ascended the throne after the murder of his elder brother Seleucus VI, becoming king with his twin brother Antiochus XI. In 93 BC Antiochus XI took the Syrian capital Antioch from their cousin, Antiochus X. Antiochus XI became the senior king, and Philip I remained in a base in Cilicia. Antiochus X returned and killed Antiochus XI that year. Philip I then allied with his younger brother Demetrius III, who was based in Damascus. Antiochus X was probably killed in 88 BC. Demetrius III took the capital and besieged Philip I in Beroea (Aleppo), but the latter prevailed and took Antioch; their youngest brother Antiochus XII took Damascus.

Philip I tried unsuccessfully to take Damascus for himself, after which he disappears from the historical record; there is no information about when or how he died. The Antiochenes, apparently refusing to accept Philip I's minor son Philip II as his successor, invited Tigranes II of Armenia to take the city. While the invasion of Tigranes II is traditionally dated to 83 BC, the year most scholars agree on for Philip I's death, the conflict may have taken place in 74 BC. Numismatic evidence and clues in ancient contemporary literature indicate that Philip I might have died in 75 BC, giving Antiochus X's widow Cleopatra Selene and her son Antiochus XIII, who probably took control of the south following the death of Antiochus XII in 82 BC, a year of claiming the whole kingdom. Philip I initiated monetary reforms, and his coins remained in circulation until the Romans conquered Syria in 64 BC. Thereafter, Roman authorities in Syria continued to issue coins modeled on Philip I's coins, including his portrait, until 13 BC.

== Background, name and early life ==
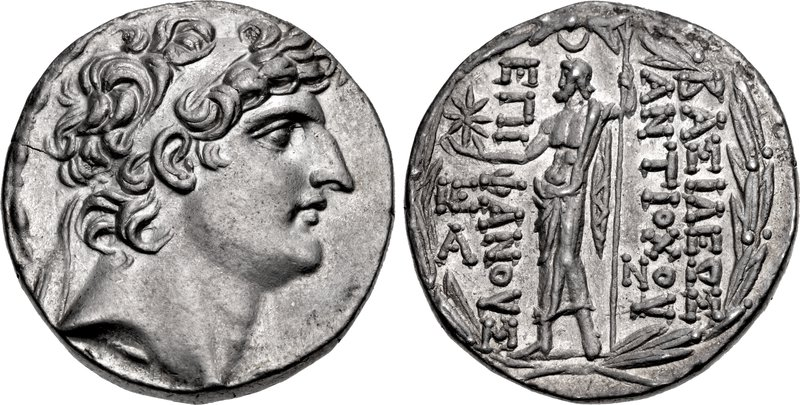
Coin of Antiochus VIII, father of Philip I

The Seleucid dynasty which ruled Syria following the death of Alexander the Great was plagued by dynastic feuds during the 2nd century BC, exacerbated by Ptolemaic and Roman interference. Dynastic marriage was used to maintain a degree of peace between Ptolemaic Egypt and Syria; Ptolemaic princess Cleopatra Thea became the consort of three successive Syrian kings in 150, 145 and 138 BC. Syria gradually disintegrated due to constant civil wars, as the Seleucid kings and their heirs fought for power, tearing the country apart. This lasted until about 123 BC, when Antiochus VIII provided a degree of stability which lasted for a decade until his brother Antiochus IX declared himself king.

With his Ptolemaic wife Tryphaena, whom he married in 124 BC, Antiochus VIII fathered five sons: Seleucus VI, the eldest; Antiochus XI and Philip I, who were apparently twins; (Note: Philip I's parents were identified as Antiochus VIII and Tryphaena by the fourth century historian Eusebius, who noted that Antiochus XI and Philip I were twins (didymi).) their younger brother, Demetrius III; and the youngest, Antiochus XII. The name Philip (Greek Phílippos) means "lover of horses". Seleucid kings were mostly named Seleucus and Antiochus; "Philip" was used by the Antigonid dynasty as a royal name, and its use by the Seleucids, who were descended from the Antigonids through Queen Stratonice, was probably meant to signify that they were heirs of the latter. The war with Antiochus IX claimed Tryphaena's life in 109 BC. Following Antiochus VIII's assassination in 96 BC, his second wife, Tryphaena's sister Cleopatra Selene, married Antiochus IX, who took Antioch. Antiochus VIII's sons did not submit to their uncle; Seleucus VI took Antioch in 95 BC after killing Antiochus IX, while Demetrius III seized and ruled Damascus. Antiochus IX's son Antiochus X married Cleopatra Selene and defeated Seleucus VI, who escaped to Mopsuestia, where he was killed by rebels in 94 BC.

== Reign ==
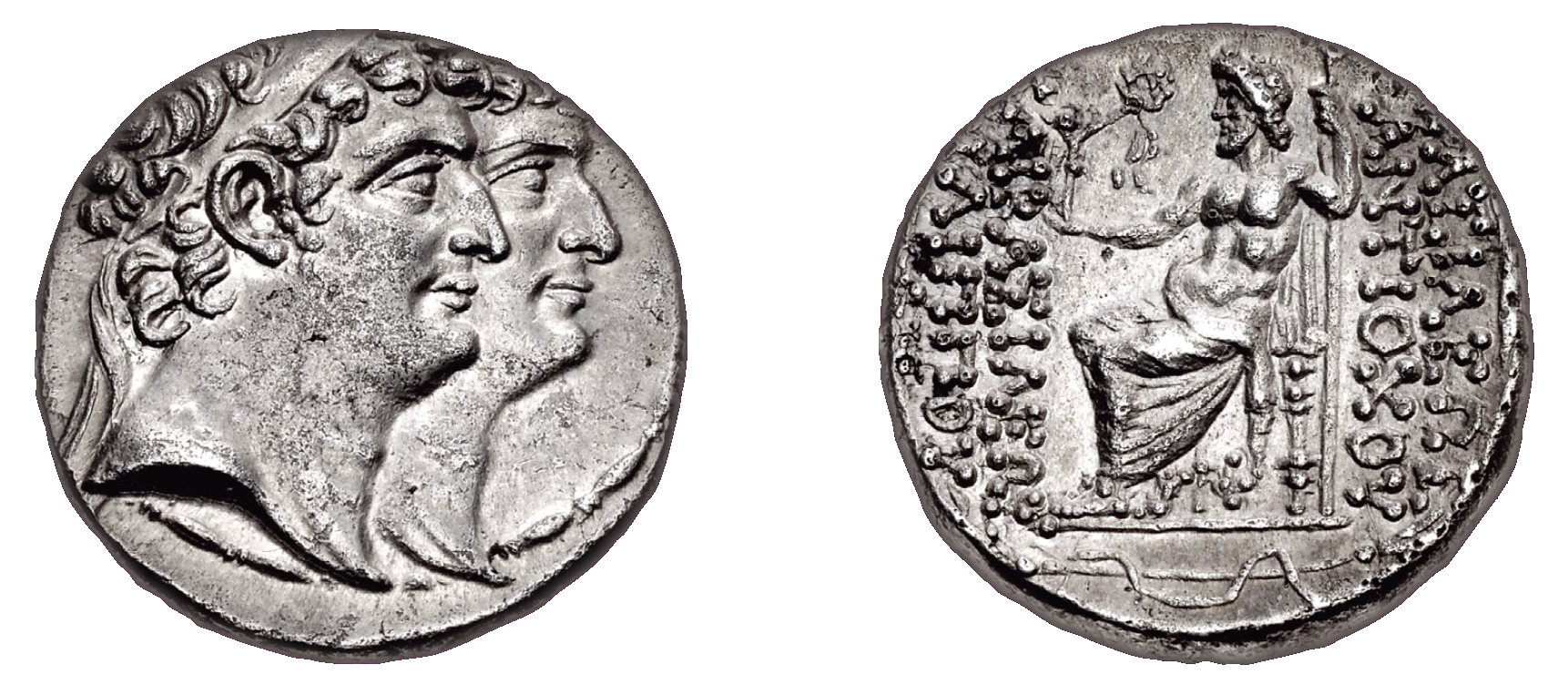
Jugate coin of Antiochus XI and Philip I

Philip I and Antiochus XI probably resided in Cilicia during Seleucus VI's reign. In 94 BC, shortly after their brother's death, Philip I and Antiochus XI minted jugate coins with their portraits on the obverse. The historian Alfred Bellinger suggested that their base of operations was a coastal city north of Antioch, but according to the numismatist Arthur Houghton, Beroea is a stronger candidate because the city's rulers were Philip I's allies. All the jugate coins were minted in Cilicia; the series with the most numerous surviving specimens was probably issued in Tarsus, making it the likely base of operations. Antiochus XI was portrayed in front of his brother, indicating that he was the senior king. (Note: According to Josephus, only Antiochus XI became king and Philip I succeeded him; numismatic evidence opposes this statement, since the earliest coins show Philip I and Antiochus XI as joint rulers.) Deriving their legitimacy from Antiochus VIII, the brothers were depicted on the coins with exaggerated aquiline noses similar to their father. Hellenistic kings did not use regnal numbers, which is a modern practise; instead, they used epithets to distinguish themselves from similarly named monarchs. On his coins, Philip I used the epithets Philadelphus (sibling-loving) and Epiphanes (the glorious, or illustrious). The brothers intended to avenge Seleucus VI; (Note: The earliest coins show the monarchs bearded, a possible sign of mourning or vengeance.) according to the fourth century writer Eusebius, they sacked Mopsuestia and destroyed it. (Note: Eusebius' statement is doubtful; in 86 BC, Rome bestowed inviolability upon the cult of Isis and Sarapis in Mopsuestia (evidenced by a dated inscription found in the city), weakening the credibility of Eusebius' account.)

=== Reign in Cilicia and Beroea ===
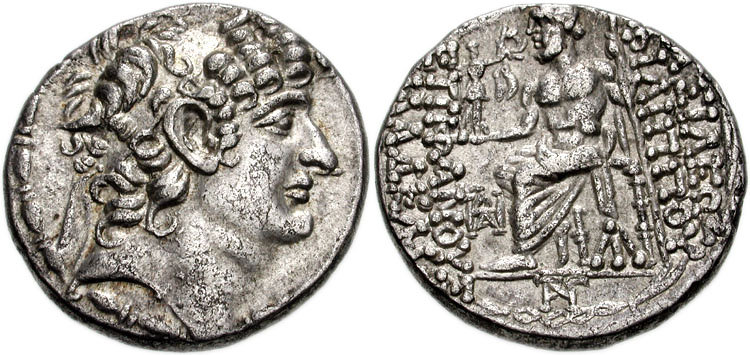
Tetradrachm of Philip I minted in Cilicia

While Philip I remained in Cilicia, Antiochus XI advanced on Antioch and drove Antiochus X from the city in the beginning of 93 BC. Philip I did not live in the Syrian metropolis and left Antiochus XI as master of the capital. (Note: Eusebius does not note Antiochus XI's reign in Antioch, and the occupation of the capital by Antiochus XI in 93 BC is known only through the coins he struck in it.) By autumn 93 BC, Antiochus X regrouped and defeated Antiochus XI, who drowned in the Orontes. The first century historian Josephus mentioned only Antiochus XI in the battle, but Eusebius wrote that Philip I was also present. Bellinger believed that Philip I's troops participated, but that he remained behind at his base, since only Antiochus XI was killed. Following the defeat, Philip I is thought to have retreated to his capital, which was probably the same base from which he and his brother operated when they first prepared to avenge Seleucus VI. Antiochus X eventually controlled Cilicia, and Philip I probably took Beroea as his base.

Demetrius III may have marched north to support Antiochus XI in the battle of 93 BC, and he certainly supported Philip I in the struggle against Antiochus X. Eusebius wrote that Philip I defeated Antiochus X and replaced him in the capital in 93/92 BC (220 SE (Seleucid year)). (Note: Some dates in the article are given according to the Seleucid era which is indicated when two years have a slash separating them. Each Seleucid year started in the late autumn of a Gregorian year; thus, a Seleucid year overlaps two Gregorian ones.) However, Eusebius does not note the reign of Antiochus XI or mention Demetrius III. The account contradicts archaeological evidence, represented in a market weight belonging to Antiochus X from 92 BC, and contains factual mistakes. The English minister and numismatist Edgar Rogers believed that Philip I ruled Antioch immediately after Antiochus XI, but suggestions that Philip I controlled Antioch before the demise of Antiochus X and Demetrius III can be dismissed; they contradict the numismatic evidence, and no ancient source claimed that Demetrius III, who actually succeeded Antiochus X in Antioch, had to push Philip I out of the city.

In any case, Antiochus X disappeared from the record after 92 BC, but could have remained in power until 224 SE (89/88 BC); he probably died fighting against Parthia. (Note: Josephus wrote, "Both these brothers did Antiochus vehemently oppose, but presently died; for when he was come as an auxiliary to Laodice, queen of the Gileadites, when she was making war against the Parthians, and he was fighting courageously, he fell, while Demetrius and Philip governed Syria". The Parthians might have been allied with Philip I.) Taking advantage of Antiochus X's death, Demetrius III rushed to the capital and occupied it; this led Philip I to break his alliance with his brother. With most of Syria in the hands of Demetrius III, Philip I retreated to his base. (Note: Coins of Demetrius III were struck in Tarsus, Seleucia Pieria, Antioch and Damascus.) In 88 BC, Demetrius III marched on Beroea for the final battle with Philip I. To raise the siege, Philip I's ally Straton, the ruler of Beroea, called on the Arab phylarch Aziz and the Parthian governor Mithridates Sinaces for help. The allies defeated Demetrius III, who was sent into captivity in Parthia. Any captive who was a citizen of Antioch was released without a ransom, a gesture which must have eased Philip I's occupation of Antioch.

=== Reign in the capital ===
Philip I's realm c. 87 BC

Shortly after the battle, in late 88 BC or early 87 BC, Philip I entered the Syrian capital, and had Cilicia under his authority. He was faced with the need to replenish the empty treasury to rebuild a country destroyed after years of civil war, and in case a new pretender to the throne arose. Those factors, combined with the low estimates of annual coin dies used by Philip I's immediate predecessors in Antioch—Antiochus X (his second reign) and Demetrius III—compared with the general die estimates of late Seleucid kings, led numismatist Oliver D. Hoover to propose that Philip I simply re-coined his predecessors' coins and skewed their dies. This resulted in currency bearing Philip I's image, reduced in weight from the standard 1,600 g (56 oz) to 1,565 g (55.2 oz). This yielded a profit of half an obol on each older coin which was re-struck. Profit was, however, not the main aim of Philip I; it is more probable that he wanted to pay his troops with coins bearing his own image instead of that of his rivals. The recoinage was also necessary since Philip I's coins were reduced in weight and the king needed to enforce the use of his currency by removing his rivals' heavier coins out of circulation. Philip I may have adopted the New Seleucid era dating, which have the return of Antiochus VIII from his exile in Aspendos in 200 SE (113/112 BC) as a starting point; the traditional Seleucid era started in 1 SE (312/311 BC).

Philip I's position on the throne was insecure: Cleopatra Selene hid in Syria with Antiochus XIII, her son by Antiochus X, waiting for an opportunity to regain the throne, while Antiochus XII replaced Demetrius III in Damascus, but there is no evidence that he sought to compete with his brother for Antioch. According to Josephus, Philip I took advantage of Antiochus XII's absence in a campaign against Nabataea to seize Damascus. The governor of the city—Milesius, who opened the gates for the Philip I—was not given a suitable reward by his new master, leading him to wait until Philip I left the city; he then closed the gates, locking the king out until Antiochus XII returned. In the Seleucid dynasty, currency struck during campaigns against a rival (or usurper) showed the king with a beard. Antiochus XII was shown beardless for the first two years of his reign; in 228 SE (85/84 BC), he appeared with a beard, possibly related to Philip I's attack on Damascus. But since Antiochus XII did not march north against his brother, the hypothesis about a connection between Antiochus XII' beard and Philip I's attempt to take Damascus weakens; no coins of Philip I were struck in Damascus, indicating that his occupation of the city was brief.

== End and succession ==
After the attack on Damascus, Philip I disappeared from ancient literature. Without proof, 83 BC is commonly accepted as Philip I's year of death by most scholars; he could have been buried in the Nikatoreion Mausoleum, Seleucia Pieria. (Note: King Antiochus I buried the cremated remains of his father, the dynasty's founder, Seleucus I, in a mausoleum named the Nikatoreion in Seleucia Pieria; no literary or archaeological evidence exist for the burial locations of other Seleucid kings, but it is possible that they were buried in the Nikatoreion.) Traditionally, Philip I is considered by most scholars to have been succeeded by Tigranes II of Armenia, who was invited by the people of Antioch despite the existence of Philip I's probably-minor son Philip II. The second century historian Appian assigned a fourteen-year reign to Tigranes II which ended in 69 BC, and most scholars accepted the ancient historian's version, hence the date 83 BC. The fate of Philip I is a source of debate in academic circles, as no clues regarding how, where, and when, his life ended, exist. (Note: Eusebius and Jerome conflated the fate of Philip I with that of his son Philip II claiming that Philip I was captured by the Roman governor of Syria Aulus Gabinius.) Many theories were presented by different historians:

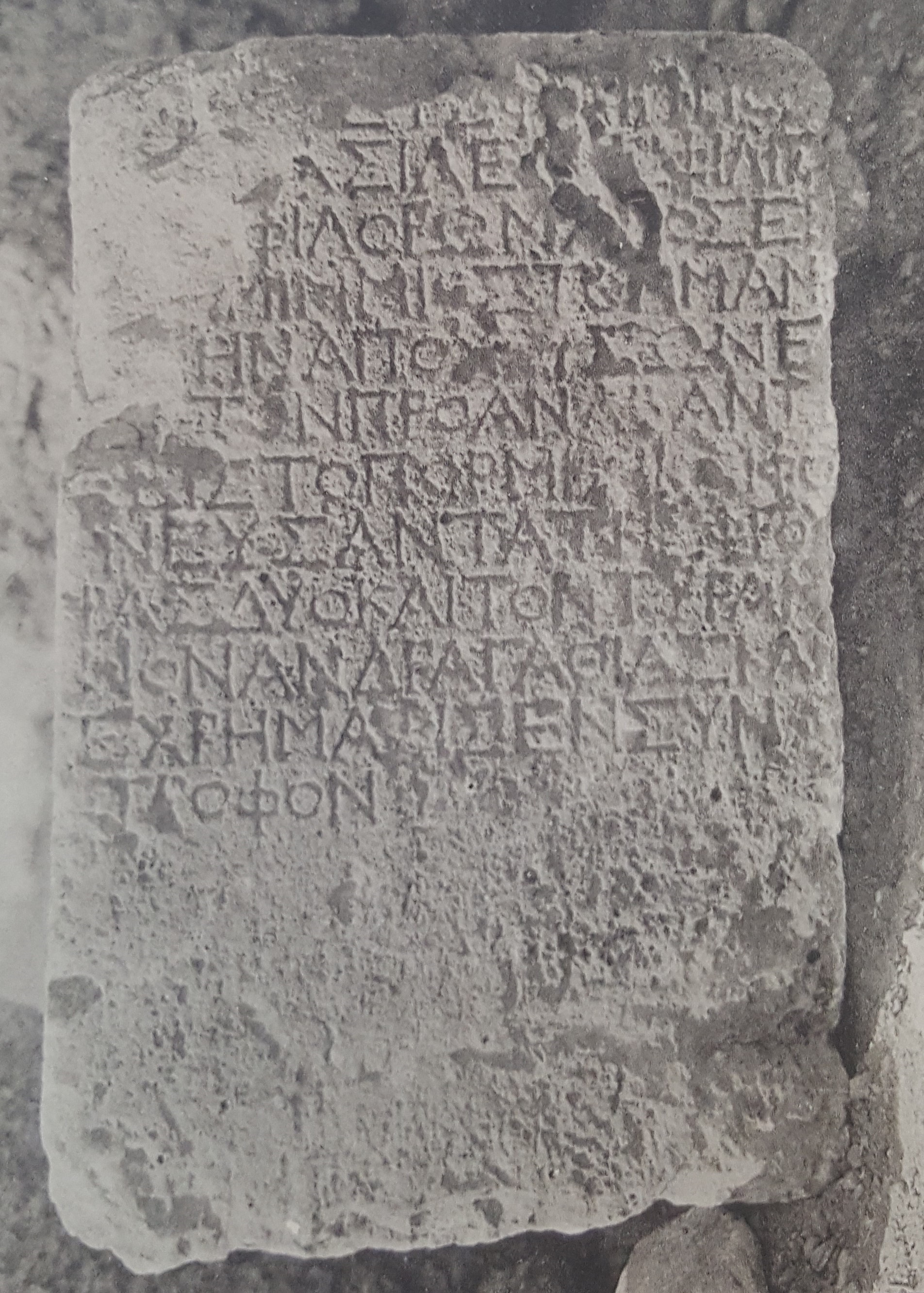
Inscription of Philip II

- Escaped to Cilicia: An inscription of Philip II was found in Olba, the capital of a Cilician priestly principality. Historian Auguste Bouché-Leclercq concluded that Philip I could not have returned to the capital following his defeat in Damascus because the populace became weary of the endless Seleucid dynastic quarrels. Bouché-Leclercq conjectured, based on the inscription of his son, that Philip I might have escaped to Cilicia and died in the chaos caused by the Second Mithridatic War (83–81 BC) between Mithridates VI of Pontus and Rome. Another possibility is that Philip I was preparing to take back his throne after the death of Antiochus XII (d. 82 BC), but was caught off guard by the arrival of Tigranes II and put to death in Cilicia. Historian Theodora Stillwell MacKay suggested that Philip I fled to Olba following his confrontation with Antiochus XII. The epigraphers Josef Keil and Adolf Wilhelm suggested that Philip I stayed with the priest-prince of the city.
- Peaceful long reign: according to Bellinger, the silence of ancient literature might be an indication of a peaceful reign that was perhaps facilitated by Philip I's alliance with Parthia; this would explain the massive amount of silver coinage produced by Philip I found as far as Dura-Europos, which was under Parthian rule. Appian's account is flawed, and contradicts contemporary accounts, notably the Roman statesman Cicero, who wrote in 75 BC that Cleopatra Selene sent Antiochus XIII to Rome to appeal for his right to the Egyptian throne; he did not have to appeal for his rights to Syria which, in the words of Cicero, he inherited from his ancestors. Cleopatra Selene and her son probably took advantage of Antiochus XII's death in 82 BC to assume control of the south; the statement of Cicero indicates that in 75 BC, Tigranes II was still not in control of Syria, for if he were, Antiochus XIII would have asked the Roman Senate for support to regain Syria, since Tigranes II was the son-in-law of Rome's enemy, Mithridates VI. Likewise, Philip I could not have been alive since Antiochus XIII went to Rome without having to assert his right to Syria.

The argument for a later Armenian invasion is corroborated by Josephus, who wrote that the Jews heard about the Armenian invasion and Tigranes II's plans to attack Judea only during the reign of the Hasmonean queen Salome Alexandra, which began in 76 BC; it would be odd if Tigranes II took control of Syria in 83 BC and the Jews learned about it only after 76 BC. Another point of argument is the massive quantity of coinage left by Philip I, which could not have been produced if his reign was short and ended in 83 BC. In light of this, Hoover proposed 75 BC, or slightly earlier, as Philip I's last year; this would be in line with Cicero's statement about Antiochus XIII. Hoover suggested the year 74 BC as the date of Tigranes II's invasion, giving Cleopatra Selene and her son time to claim the whole country. (Note: Cleopatra Selene and her son never controlled Antioch, but possessed parts of Syria.)

== Legacy ==
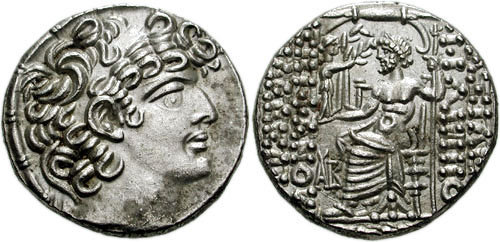
Roman coin bearing the image of Philip I

Philip I's coins were still in circulation when the Romans annexed Syria in 64 BC. The first Roman coins struck in Syria were copies of Philip I's coins, and bore his image with the monogram of the Roman governor. The first issue was in 57 BC under governor Aulus Gabinius, and the last series of Philip I's posthumous coins was minted in 13 BC. The Romans may have considered Philip I the last legitimate Seleucid king, a theory held by Kevin Butcher and other scholars. Hoover opted for a simpler answer; Philip I's coins were the most numerous and earlier Seleucid coin models were destroyed, making it economically sensible for the Romans to continue Philip I's model. Anomalous coins of Philip, differing from his standard lifetime models but similar to the later Roman Philip coins, indicate that they might have been minted by the autonomous city of Antioch between 64 and 58 BC before governor Aulus Gabinius issued his Philipean coins, making it viable for the Romans to continue minting coins already being struck.

== Family tree ==
Family tree of Philip I

Seleucus IV (Note: Hoover 2000, p. 107)	Laodice IV (Note: Hoover 2000, p. 108)	Ptolemy V	Cleopatra I
Demetrius I	Laodice V	Ptolemy VI	Cleopatra II
Demetrius II (Note: Wright 2012, p. iii)	Cleopatra Thea (Note: Ogden 1999, p. 149)	Cleopatra III	Ptolemy VIII
Antiochus VIII	Tryphaena
Philip I

Citations:

== See also ==
- List of Syrian monarchs
- List of Seleucid rulers
- Timeline of Syrian history

== Notes ==
Philip I Philadelphus Seleucid dynasty Born: Unknown Died: 83 or 75 BC
Regnal titles
Preceded by Seleucus VI; Demetrius III; Antiochus X	King of Syria; 94–83 or 75 BC with Demetrius III (94–87 BC); Antiochus X (94–92 or 88 BC); Antiochus XI (94–93 BC); Antiochus XII (87–82 BC); Antiochus XIII (82–75 BC); Cleopatra Selene (82–75 BC)	Succeeded by Antiochus XIII; Cleopatra Selene
