= Laodice of the Sameans =

Laodice was a Queen of an unknown Kingdom in Asia. She lived at the time of the Seleucid king of Syria Antiochus X Eusebes who reigned 95 BC-92 or 88 BC.

== Historical account ==
Laodice is known from the work of the first century historian Josephus. In about 92 BC, she sent a petition to Antiochus X Eusebes of Syria asking for help against Parthia. In response, Antiochus X marched against the Parthians but was killed in battle.

== The people and kingdom ==
=== The name of the tribe ===
It is hard to identify the people of Laodice; each of the surviving manuscripts containing Josephus' work transmits a different version. There are two names and different varieties of them depending on the manuscript. In the Codex Leidensis (Lugdunensis), it is Γαλιχηνών (Gileadites). (Note: William Whiston gave Gileadites as the name's form in his English translation of the work of Josephus; he used the Latin translation of the Dutch classicist Siwart Haverkamp, who in turn used masuscripts including the Codex Leidensis. Haverkamp had Laodice Galadenorum regina in his translation from Greek to Latin.) The Codex Palatinus (Vaticanus) Graecus has the name Σαμηνών; this rendering was used by Benedikt Niese in his edition of the work of Josephus. Josef Dobiáš (historian) stated that the Niese's version is more plausible, and this has become the academic consensus; Σαμηνών is rendered in English, depending on the historian, as Sameans, Sameni or Samenians.

=== Identification and location ===
Σαμηνών from the Codex Palatinus is similar to the name of a people mentioned by Stephanus of Byzantium as the Σαμηνώί, or Σαμηνoί (Dobiáš rendered it in French as Samènes); Stephanus described them as Arabian nomadic people, and Dobiáš accepted that the Σαμηνών are the same as the Σαμηνoί (Samènes); thus Laodice was the queen of an Arab tribe. Bernhard Moritz rendered the people mentioned by Stephanus as the Samenoi, and identified them with the Samnei, (Samnaei in the rendition of Dobiáš), who were an Arab tribe of southern Arabia according to Pliny the Elder; Dobiáš is sceptical about Moritz' identification.
