= Thomas R. Martin =

American historian (born 1947)

- Born: 1947 (age 78–79)
- Education: Princeton University (BA); Harvard University (MA, PhD)
- Occupations: Classicist, philologist

Thomas Runge Martin (born 1947) is an American classicist and philologist who specializes in the history of the Greco-Roman world. He is the Jeremiah W. O'Connor Jr. Chair Professor of Classics at the College of the Holy Cross. Previously, he was the Harris K. Weston Professor of the Humanities at Harvard University from 1983 to 1985 and the Henry E. Sheffield Professor of History at Pomona College from 1991 to 1992.

== Education ==
Martin graduated as valedictorian from Woodrow Wilson High School in Beckley, West Virginia, in 1965. He then attended Princeton University, where he earned a Bachelor of Arts in classics, summa cum laude, in 1970. He then received his M.A. in 1972 and his Ph.D. in 1978 with a specialization in classical philology from Harvard University, all while conducting graduate work at the American School of Classical Studies at Athens between 1973 and 1975.

== Academic career ==
After receiving his doctorate, Martin became an assistant professor of classics at Harvard University, where he was also the head tutor of the classics from 1978 to 1985. From 1983 to 1985, he was the Harris K. Weston Professor of the Humanities at Harvard University. Afterwards, he moved to Pomona College, where he was an associate professor of classics from 1985 to 1991 and the Henry E. Sheffield Professor of History from 1991 to 1992. He then became the Jeremiah O'Connor Professor in Classics at the College of the Holy Cross in 1992.

== Work ==
His research field covers the history of ancient Greece and Rome and numismatics. He is author and co-author of several publications and articles, among which include Sovereignty and Coinage in Classical Greece (Princeton University Press, 1985), Ancient Greece: From Prehistoric to Hellenistic Times (Yale University Press, 1992), The Making of the West: Peoples and Cultures (Bedford/St. Martin's, 2 vol., 2001) and Herodotus and Sima Qian: The First Great Historians of Greece and China (Bedford/St. Martin's, 2009), all reissued. “Ancient Rome: From Romulus to Justinian” (Yale University Press) was published in 2012. He has contributed to the documentaries produced by The History Channel about Roman history, especially to the series Rome: Rise and Fall of an Empire.
