= Edward Theodore Newell =

American historian

Edward Theodore Newell (1886–1941) was a U.S. numismatist. He served as the president of the American Numismatic Society between 1916 and 1941. He was awarded the medal of the Royal Numismatic Society in 1925, the first American recipient. The American Journal of Archaeology called him "America's greatest numismatist."
