= Alfred Bellinger =

American archaeologist and numismatist

Alfred Raymond Bellinger (Durham, 24 July 1893 – 12 February 1978) was an American archaeologist and numismatist. He taught at Yale University and took part in the Dura-Europos excavations and published the book: Dura final report, VI, The coins.

== Selected publications ==
- The Coinage of the Western Seleucid Mints from Seleucus I to Antiochus III. (with Edward Theodore Newell) Series: Numismatic Studies no. 4. New York: American Numismatic Society, 1941.
- The end of the Seleucids, 1949.
- Troy, the coins, 1961.
- Catalogue of Byzantine Coins in the Dumbarton and in Whittemore Collection, (with Philip Grierson), Washington, 1966–1973.
