= Apollonius Taos =

Governor of Coele-Syria under the Seleucid Empire

- Era: 2nd century BCE
- Known for: Governor of Coele-Syria under the Seleucid Empire; defection to Demetrius II Nicator; military conflict with Jonathan Maccabeus

Apollonius Taos (Ancient Greek: Ἀπολλώνιος ὁ Ταῷς) was a governor of Coele-Syria under the Seleucid Empire during the 2nd century BCE.

== Background ==
Apollonius served as governor under Alexander Balas, who ruled the Seleucid Empire from 150 to 142 BCE.

This period was marked by internal strife and external threats, creating instability within the empire. A few years earlier, in 175 B.C., Antiochus IV Epiphanes had set a violent precedent by seizing the throne from his brother, Seleucus IV Philopator, and having him assassinated.

This event initiated a pattern of violent succession crises within the Seleucid dynasty. Rival claimants to the throne often relied on foreign powers and internal factions to assert their claims, further destabilizing the empire until its eventual decline and conquest by the Roman Empire.

== Defection to Demetrius II ==
In 147 BCE, while Alexander Balas was addressing northern invasions, Apollonius Taos defected to Demetrius II Nicator. This defection was supported by the Hellenized Philistine cities, which aligned with Apollonius against Alexander. Apollonius challenged Jonathan Maccabeus, a Jewish leader and ally of Alexander, to battle, suggesting that the Jews might leave the mountains and venture into the plain.

== Conflict with Jonathan Maccabeus ==
In response, the Maccabean Jonathan Apphus and his brother Simon Thassi led a force of 10,000 men against Apollonius's forces stationed in Jaffa. The city, unprepared for an attack, opened its gates to them out of fear. Apollonius then received reinforcements from Azotus and confronted Jonathan with 3,000 men, relying on his superior cavalry. Despite being outnumbered, Jonathan's forces successfully resisted and ultimately defeated Apollonius's army. Jonathan pursued the fleeing forces to Azotus, capturing and burning the city along with the temple of Dagon. In reward for his victory, Alexander Balas granted Jonathan the city of Ekron with its surrounding territory.
