= 145 BC =

145 BC in various calendars
- Gregorian calendar: 145 BC; CXLV BC
- Ab urbe condita: 609
- Ancient Egypt era: XXXIII dynasty, 179
- Pharaoh: Ptolemy VIII Physcon, 1
- Ancient Greek Olympiad (summer): 158th Olympiad, year 4
- Assyrian calendar: 4606
- Balinese saka calendar: N/A
- Bengali calendar: −738 – −737
- Berber calendar: 806
- Buddhist calendar: 400
- Burmese calendar: −782
- Byzantine calendar: 5364–5365
- Chinese calendar: 乙未年 (Wood Goat); 2553 or 2346 — to — 丙申年 (Fire Monkey); 2554 or 2347
- Coptic calendar: −428 – −427
- Discordian calendar: 1022
- Ethiopian calendar: −152 – −151
- Hebrew calendar: 3616–3617
- Hindu calendars
- Vikram Samvat: −88 – −87
- Shaka Samvat: N/A
- Kali Yuga: 2956–2957
- Holocene calendar: 9856
- Iranian calendar: 766 BP – 765 BP
- Islamic calendar: 790 BH – 789 BH
- Javanese calendar: N/A
- Julian calendar: N/A
- Korean calendar: 2189
- Minguo calendar: 2056 before ROC 民前2056年
- Nanakshahi calendar: −1612
- Seleucid era: 167/168 AG
- Thai solar calendar: 398–399
- Tibetan calendar: ཤིང་མོ་ལུག་ལོ་ (female Wood-Sheep) −18 or −399 or −1171 — to — མེ་ཕོ་སྤྲེ་ལོ་ (male Fire-Monkey) −17 or −398 or −1170

Year 145 BC was a year of the pre-Julian Roman calendar. At the time it was known as the Year of the Consulship of Aemilianus and Mancinus (or, less frequently, year 609 Ab urbe condita). The denomination 145 BC for this year has been used since the early medieval period, when the Anno Domini calendar era became the prevalent method in Europe for naming years.

== Events ==
=== By place ===
==== Syria ====
- In the Battle of Antioch, Ptolemy VI Philometor defeats the Seleucid usurper Alexander Balas, but dies in the battle.

==== Egypt ====
- Ptolemy VII becomes king of Egypt briefly, then is assassinated by Ptolemy VIII the following year.

=== By topic ===
==== Astronomy ====
- Hipparchus determines the length of the tropical year.

== Births ==
- Sima Qian, Chinese historian (or 135 BC) (d. 86 BC)

== Deaths ==
- Alexander Balas (assassinated)
- Ptolemy VI of Egypt (killed in battle) (b. c. 186 BC)
