= Lasthenes =

Lasthenes (Ancient Greek: Λασθένης) may refer to:

- Lasthenes (Thrace), a town of ancient Thrace
- Lasthenes (general), Cretan general
- Lasthenes (Mercenary Leader), a Cretan mercenary leader
- Lasthenes, Olynthian who betrayed his city to Philip II of Macedon for a bribe in 347 BC
