= Diodotus Tryphon =

Seleucid usurper from 142 to 138 BC

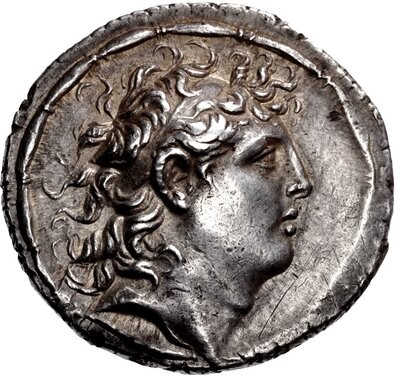
- Coin of Diodotus Tryphon, Antioch mint

Basileus of the Seleucid Empire
- Reign: 142–138 BC
- Predecessor: Antiochus VI Dionysus
- Successor: Antiochus VII Sidetes
- Born: Casiana (modern-day Şanlıurfa, Turkey)
- Died: 138 BC; Apamea (now Şanlıurfa, Turkey)

Diodotus Tryphon (Greek: Διόδοτος Τρύφων, Diódotos Trýphōn), nicknamed "The Magnificent" (Greek: Ό Μεγαλοπρεπής) was a Greek king of the Seleucid Empire. Initially an official under King Alexander I Balas, he led a revolt against Alexander's successor Demetrius II Nicator in 144 BC. He rapidly gained control of most of Syria and the Levant. At first, he acted as regent and tutor for Alexander's infant son Antiochus VI Dionysus, but after the death of his charge in 142/141 BC, Diodotus declared himself king. He took the royal name Tryphon Autocrator (Greek: Τρύφων Αὐτοκράτωρ) and distanced himself from the Seleucid dynasty. For a period between 139 and 138, he was the sole ruler of the Seleucid empire. However, in 138 BC Demetrius II's brother Antiochus VII Sidetes invaded Syria and brought his rule to an end.

Diodotus Tryphon is unique in the history of the Seleucid empire as the only rebel from outside the dynasty to gain control of the whole kingdom. Other rebels had claimed the throne, such as Molon and Timarchus, but they never succeeded in bringing the whole realm under their control and both were defeated within a year of declaring themselves kings. By contrast, Tryphon held power for over seven years from his rebellion in 144 BC until his death in 138 BC.

== Life ==
=== Generalship and regency ===
Diodotus was originally from Casiana, a dependent town of the city of Apamea. He served as a general for Alexander Balas, during the civil war which the latter fought with Demetrius II Nicator. In 145 BC, when Alexander's father-in-law Ptolemy VI of Egypt switched his support to Demetrius II and invaded Syria, Diodotus and a man called Hierax were in command of the city of Antioch. They surrendered Antioch to Ptolemy and declared him king of the Seleucid Empire. Ptolemy, unwilling to rule both the Egyptian and Seleucid realms directly, declined the title in favour of Demetrius II.

Revolt against Demetrius II

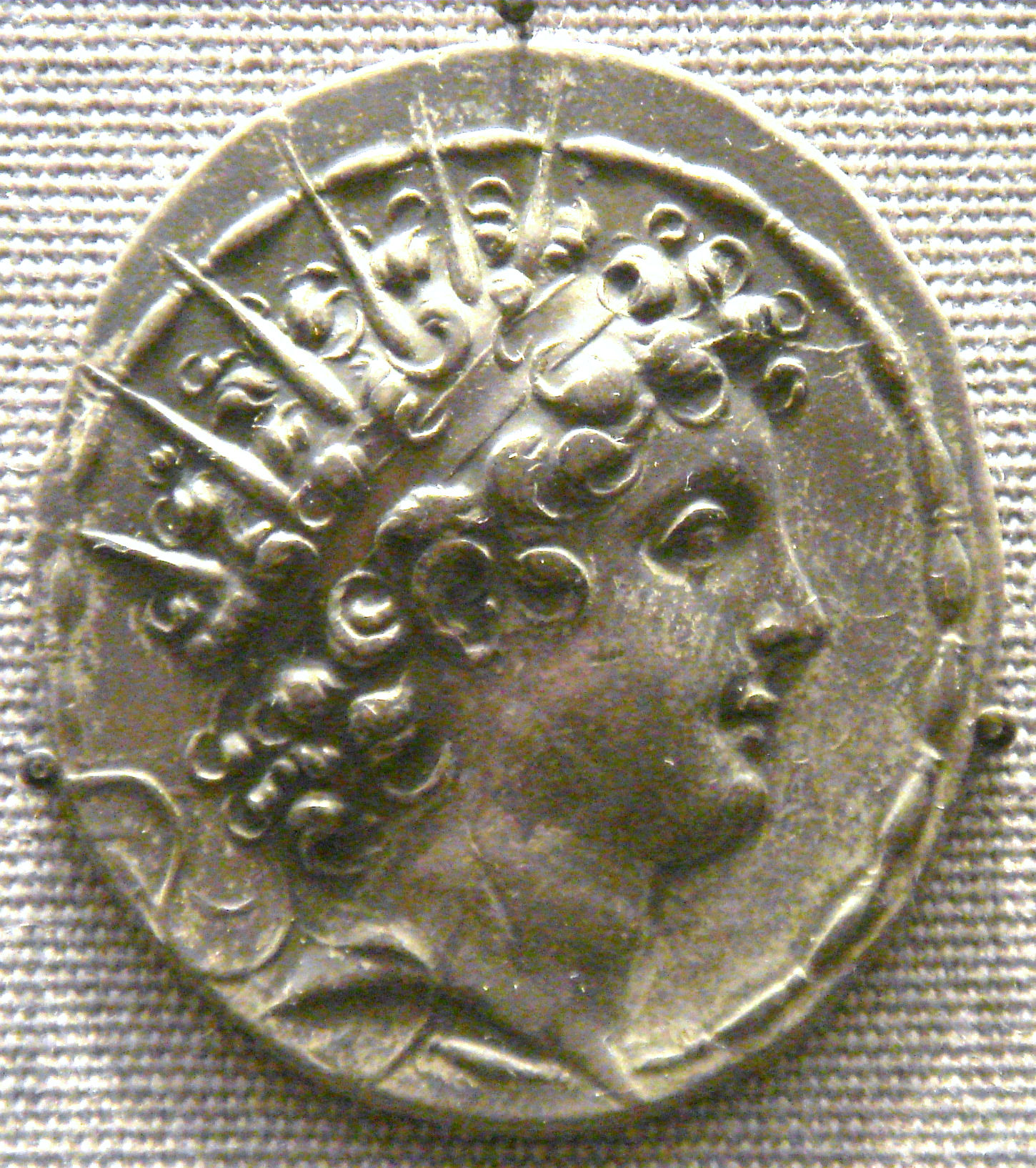
Coin struck by Diodotus in the name of Antiochus VI

As Demetrius II secured himself on the throne, he began to eliminate former associates of Alexander Balas. Diodotus (Trypho) is introduced in the First Book of Maccabees as "a certain Trypho [who] had formerly been one of Alexander’s supporters", who sees and seizes an opportunity when "he saw that all the troops were grumbling against Demetrius [II]". He probably considered himself to be in danger, and he fled to an Arab ruler called Zabdiel or Imalkue, who had been entrusted with the care of Alexander Balas's young son. Diodotus, with Arab support, declared Alexander's son the new king, as Antiochus VI Dionysus. The new king was less than five years old and Diodotus held all actual power as his regent.

Diodotus and Antiochus were initially ignored by Demetrius who had to consolidate his power and was also faced with financial troubles. Utilising the discontent against the ruling regime Diodotus gathered a large army at his headquarters in Chalcis ad Belum. Eventually, Demetrius marched against them but he was defeated in battle, after which Diodotus gained control of Apamea and Antioch. Numismatic evidence indicates that Apamea was taken in early 144 and Antioch in late 144 or early 143.

Diodotus, in the name of the boy-king Antiochus VI, controlled most of Inland Syria, including Antioch, Apamea, Larisa and Chalcis. Demetrius on the other hand based himself in Seleucia Pieria and retained control of many of the Syrian and Phoenician coastal cities and Cilicia. Mesopotamia continued to recognise Demetrius as well and an invasion of the region by Diodotus in mid-144 seems to have been a failure. Territories further east, such as Susa and Elymais were conquered by the Parthians, who eventually took control of Mesopotamia as well in mid-141 BC.

Intervention in Judaea

At the same time Diodotus made diplomatic overtures to the Jews under Jonathan Apphus in order to have them join with him against Demetrius, giving him honours and appointing his brother Simon Thassi as general. Jonathan accepted these overtures. Josephus justifies this by claiming that Demetrius had persecuted the Jews and that the memory of Alexander Balas encouraged them to support his son Antiochus VI. The situation did not last, however. The Jewish sources claim that the boldness of the Jonathan's attacks on Demetrius' supporters led Diodotus to fear his power and begin to plot against him. In 142 BC, Diodotus dispatched troops who lured Jonathan to Ptolemais with a small guard and captured him. Although Simon Thassi paid the money that Diodotus had demanded as a ransom for his brother, Diodotus had him executed anyway and attempted to attack Jerusalem. Heavy snowfall forced him to abandon the siege and return to Syria. Simon quickly became a close ally of Demetrius II, who granted extensive freedoms to him - later seen as the moment when the Hasmonean Jewish state achieved full independence.

In the same year an army of Tryphon's routed a pro-Demetrius force under Sarpedon between Ptolemais and Tyre, but as they were marching along the coast in pursuit, a great tidal wave wiped out the army, according to Athenaeus.

=== Kingship ===
In late 142 or early 141 BC, Antiochus VI Dionysus died, supposedly during a medical operation; most ancient sources accuse Diodotus of having had the young king murdered. Diodotus convinced the army to elect him king.

Royal titles and representation

As king, Diodotus used the name Tryphon Autocrator. 'Tryphon' referred to the Hellenistic royal virtue of tryphe (luxury). Tryphe was sometimes a negative attribute, implying softness, but could also be a positive virtue, advertising the ruler's wealth and ability to reward his subjects. The epithet Autokrator is unique; it is not attested for any other Greek ruler from this period. Edwyn Bevan argued that this epithet was intended to recall the Macedonian kings Philip II and Alexander the Great, who had held the title of Strategos Autokrator as elected leaders of the Greek forces against Persia. In Bevan's view this reference indicated Tryphon's election as king by the 'free Greco-Macedonian states of Syria'. Boris Chrubasik argues that Tryphon took the epithet in imitation of the Parthian rulers and to emphasise his independence from his predecessors (the term Autokrator literally means 'ruling (by) himself'). The martial overtones of it perhaps served to counter the implications of softness that sometimes were associated with tryphe.

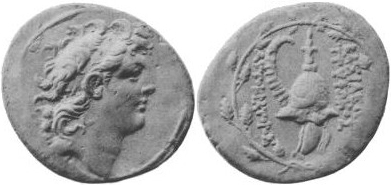
Coin of king Diodotus Tryphon. Obverse showing a decorated Boeotian helmet. The Greek legend reads: ΒΑΣΙΛΕΩΣ ΤΡΥΦΩΝΟΣ ΑΥΤΟΚΡΑΤΟΡΟΣ, Basileōs Tryphōnos Autokratoros, "of the self-ruler Tryphon."

There is no sign that Tryphon considered himself to be part of the Seleucid dynasty. On the contrary, he emphasised the break with his Seleucid predecessors through his unusual title, as well as the iconography of his coinage. His coins depicts him in a mature guise, with a rather fat face and long flowing hair - emphasising the luxuriousness implied by the name Trypon. The reverse side of his coins depict an elaborately decorated Boeotian helmet. This might have been meant to extend his connection to the army, and/or to further emphasise the idea of martial luxury. The break with the Seleucids was also indicated by the abandonment of the Seleucid dating system, in which years were counted continuously from the rise to power of Seleucus I. Tryphon instituted a new system, counting from his own accession as king.

In order to secure Roman recognition of his kingship, Tryphon sent a golden statue of the goddess Nike to Rome. The Roman Senate chose to accept this Nike as a gift from Antiochus VI and did not extend recognition to Tryphon. There is no evidence that any of the neighbouring kings recognised Tryphon's kingship either.

War against Demetrius II and Antiochus VII

Once he was king, Tryphon expanded his control to at least Ptolemais-Akke and Dor. Demetrius, meanwhile, had journeyed east in 139/8 to fight the Parthians, who had seized control of Mesopotamia the previous year. He was defeated and captured by them July or August of 138 BC, leaving Tryphon as uncontested ruler of the remaining Seleucid territories.

Almost immediately, however, Demetrius' brother, Antiochus VII Sidetes took up the conflict against Tryphon. He declared himself King Antiochus Euergetes, left his home in Rhodes, and landed in Phoenicia in the face of staunch resistance. He married the wife of Demetrius, Cleopatra Thea, further legitimizing his position. Numismatic evidence shows that many coastal cities remained loyal to Tryphon, but that Sidon and Tyre immediately attached themselves to Antiochus' cause. Antiochus also successfully won over Simon Thassi by confirming and augmenting the grants made by his brother.

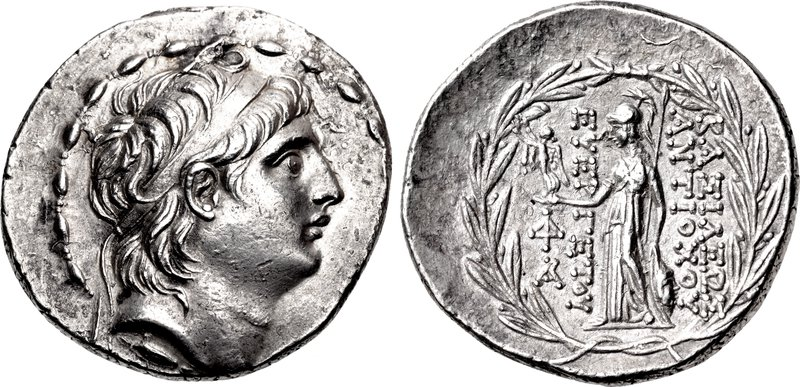
Coin of Antiochus VII Sidetes

Antiochus defeated Tryphon in battle and took control of Antioch by the middle of 138 BC. He moved south to the fortress-city of Dor, where he was besieged. From there he escaped by sea to Orthosia and made his way to his home-region of Apamea, where he was besieged again. He died in late 138 or early 137 BC. Some sources say he was captured and executed, others that he committed suicide.

== See also ==
- List of Syrian monarchs
- Timeline of Syrian history

== Bibliography ==
Primary

- Polybius, Histories
- Periochae of Livy, Ab Urbe Condita Libri LV
- Strabo, Geographica
- Josephus, Antiquities of the Jews (AJ) XIII
- Appian, Syrian Wars
- Justin, Epitome of the Philippic History of Pompeius Trogus XXXVI
- Diodorus Siculus, Bibliotheca historica XXXIII
- First Book of Maccabees, a deutero-canonical biblical text

Secondary

- Bevan, Edwyn Robert (1902). The House of Seleucus.
- Sherwin-White, Susan; Kuhrt, Amelie (1993). From Samarkhand to Sardis: A new approach to the Seleucid Empire.
- Grainger, John D. (1997). A Seleukid Prosopography and Gazetter.
- Chrubasik, Boris (2016). Kings and Usurpers in the Seleukid Empire: The Men who would be King. Oxford: Oxford University Press. ISBN 9780198786924.

Preceded by Antiochus VI Dionysus	Seleucid King (King of Syria); 142–138 BC with Demetrius II Nicator (145–138 BC)	Succeeded by Antiochus VII Sidetes
