= 186 BC =

186 BC in various calendars
- Gregorian calendar: 186 BC; CLXXXVI BC
- Ab urbe condita: 568
- Ancient Egypt era: XXXIII dynasty, 138
- Pharaoh: Ptolemy V Epiphanes, 18
- Ancient Greek Olympiad (summer): 148th Olympiad, year 3
- Assyrian calendar: 4565
- Balinese saka calendar: N/A
- Bengali calendar: −779 – −778
- Berber calendar: 765
- Buddhist calendar: 359
- Burmese calendar: −823
- Byzantine calendar: 5323–5324
- Chinese calendar: 甲寅年 (Wood Tiger); 2512 or 2305 — to — 乙卯年 (Wood Rabbit); 2513 or 2306
- Coptic calendar: −469 – −468
- Discordian calendar: 981
- Ethiopian calendar: −193 – −192
- Hebrew calendar: 3575–3576
- Hindu calendars
- Vikram Samvat: −129 – −128
- Shaka Samvat: N/A
- Kali Yuga: 2915–2916
- Holocene calendar: 9815
- Iranian calendar: 807 BP – 806 BP
- Islamic calendar: 832 BH – 831 BH
- Javanese calendar: N/A
- Julian calendar: N/A
- Korean calendar: 2148
- Minguo calendar: 2097 before ROC 民前2097年
- Nanakshahi calendar: −1653
- Seleucid era: 126/127 AG
- Thai solar calendar: 357–358
- Tibetan calendar: ཤིང་ཕོ་སྟག་ལོ་ (male Wood-Tiger) −59 or −440 or −1212 — to — ཤིང་མོ་ཡོས་ལོ་ (female Wood-Hare) −58 or −439 or −1211

Year 186 BC was a year of the pre-Julian Roman calendar. At the time it was known as the Year of the Consulship of Albinus and Philippus (or, less frequently, year 568 Ab urbe condita). The denomination 186 BC for this year has been used since the early medieval period, when the Anno Domini calendar era became the prevalent method in Europe for naming years.

== Events ==
=== By place ===
==== Roman Republic ====
- The rapid spread of the Bacchanalia cult throughout the Roman Republic, which, it is claimed, indulges in all kinds of crimes and political conspiracies at its nocturnal meetings, leads to the Roman Senate issuing a decree, the Senatus consultum de Bacchanalibus, by which the Bacchanalia are prohibited throughout all Italy except in certain special cases which must be approved specifically by the Senate.

==== Asia Minor ====
- Eumenes II of Pergamum defeats Prusias I of Bithynia.

==== China ====
- The first burial at the famous archaeological site of Mawangdui is made during the Western Han dynasty of China.

== Births ==
- Ptolemy VI Philometor, king of Egypt, who will reign from 180 BC (d. 145 BC)

== Deaths ==
- Li Cang, Marquis of Dai, buried in one of the Mawangdui
