= Theopator =

Theopator (Ancient Greek: Θεοπάτωρ), meaning "one who has a father who is a god", is a title used by Hellenistic, Roman, and Parthian rulers. The term was also used in Christian literature, but not with the same meaning, it meant "father of God" and was used to describe the relationship of blood between David (David Theopator) and Jesus. (see Davidic line).

== Hellenistic ==
It has been found on Seleucid coins.

Hellenistic rulers who used the epithet:

- Alexander Balas

== Roman ==
The term was found in an epigram at Heraion of Samos and was used to describe emperor Titus.

== Parthian ==
Parthian rulers adopted the Greek iconography and titles and some kings used on their coins the epithet, with Greek letters on the obverse under the royal portrait. (see List of monarchs of Persia#Parthian Empire (247 BC – AD 228))

== Christianity ==
The term was also used by Hesychius, who was a Presbyter of Jerusalem, with a different meaning though. He used it as "father of God", in order to describe David as the ancestor of Jesus.
