= Antiochus VI Dionysus =

King of the Seleucid Empire

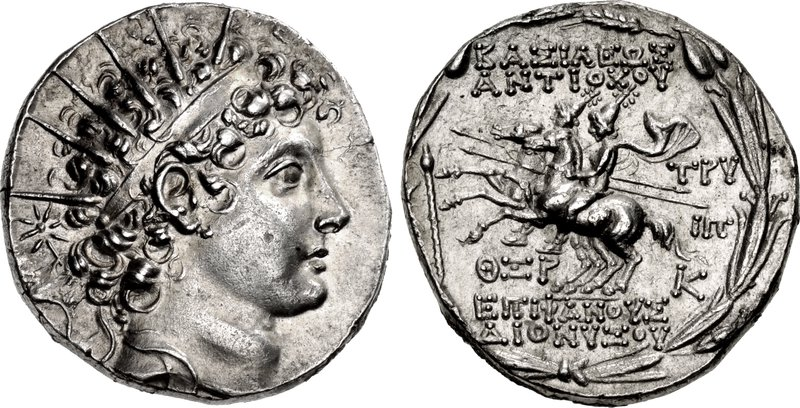
- Coin of Antiochus VI Dionysus, Apamea mint

King of the Seleucid Empire
- Reign: Seleucid kingdom: 145 or in early 144 BC – 142/1 BC
- Coronation: Never officially held power, in opposition of King Demetrius II Nicator
- Predecessor: Alexander I Balas
- Successor: Diodotus Tryphon
- Regent: Diodotus Tryphon
- Born: 148 BC
- Died: 142/1 BC (aged 7–9)
- Father: Alexander Balas
- Mother: Cleopatra Thea

Antiochus VI Dionysus (c. 148–142/1 BC), king of the Hellenistic Seleucid kingdom, was the son of Alexander Balas and Cleopatra Thea, daughter of Ptolemy VI of Egypt.

== Biography ==
Antiochus VI did not actually rule. Either already in 145 or in early 144 BC he was nominated by the general Diodotus Tryphon as heir to the throne in opposition to Demetrius II, and remained the general's tool. In c. 142/141 BC, the young king died. While some ancient authors make Diodotus Tryphon responsible for the death of the king, others write that he died during a surgery.

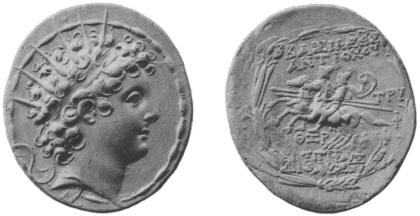
Coin of Antiochus VI. The reverse shows Castor and Polydeuces on horseback. The Greek inscription reads ΒΑΣΙΛΕΩΣ ΑΝΤΙΟΧΟΥ (king Antiochus). The date ΘΞΡ is 169 of the Seleucid era, corresponding to 144–143 BC.

== See also ==
- List of Syrian monarchs
- Timeline of Syrian history

== Footnotes ==
Antiochus VI Dionysus Seleucid dynasty Born: 148 BC Died: 142/1 BC
Preceded by Alexander Balas	Seleucid King (King of Syria); 145–142 BC with Demetrius II Nicator (145–138 BC); Diodotus Tryphon (co-regent)	Succeeded by Diodotus Tryphon
