= Lasthenes (mercenary leader) =

Cretan mercenary leader

Lasthenes (Λασθένης)
- Born: Crete, Greece
- Occupation(s): Mercenary, Court Official
- Known for: Military leadership under Demetrius II

Lasthenes (Greek: Λασθένης) was a Cretan mercenary leader and high-ranking official in the Seleucid court during the mid-2nd century BCE. He played a crucial role in the rise of Demetrius II Nicator, securing the throne for the young king and subsequently assuming a powerful position within the Seleucid administration.

== Background ==
Cretan mercenaries had a longstanding presence in Hellenistic armies, including the Seleucid military, dating back to the reign of Antiochus I (281–260 BCE). These soldiers were often recruited through treaties of συμμαχία ("alliance") between Cretan cities and Hellenistic rulers, though by the mid-2nd century BCE, Seleucid kings relied more on independent mercenary bands.

== Role in the Seleucid Kingdom ==
Lasthenes emerged as a prominent figure in Seleucid politics when Demetrius II Nicator, the son of Demetrius I Soter, sought to reclaim his father’s throne from the usurper Alexander Balas. Around 147 BCE, Demetrius landed in Cilicia with a force of Cretan mercenaries under Lasthenes’ command.

Following Demetrius’ victory and ascension to the throne, Lasthenes attained significant influence. Ancient sources, including Diodorus Siculus and Josephus, suggest that he held the position of ἐπὶ τῶν πραγμάτων ("steward of the kingdom"), effectively serving as the chief minister. He was instrumental in shaping Demetrius II’s early policies, including the controversial decision to dismiss the traditional Seleucid standing army in favor of his own mercenaries, which led to widespread unrest.

== Downfall and disappearance ==
Lasthenes’ influence ultimately contributed to Demetrius II’s unpopularity. His reliance on mercenaries and suppression of local opposition alienated the Seleucid military elite and the population of Antioch. This unrest culminated in the revolt of Diodotus Tryphon, who installed Antiochus VI Dionysus as a rival king. By this time, Lasthenes disappears from historical records, suggesting he may have been removed from power or killed during the subsequent turmoil.

== Legacy ==
The role of Cretan mercenaries in the Seleucid court, exemplified by Lasthenes, reflects the broader shift from a Graeco-Macedonian military structure to reliance on external forces. This transition marked the decline of Seleucid stability, as later rulers increasingly depended on mercenaries rather than a native military base.
