= Apamea (Euphrates) =

Hellenistic city in Turkey

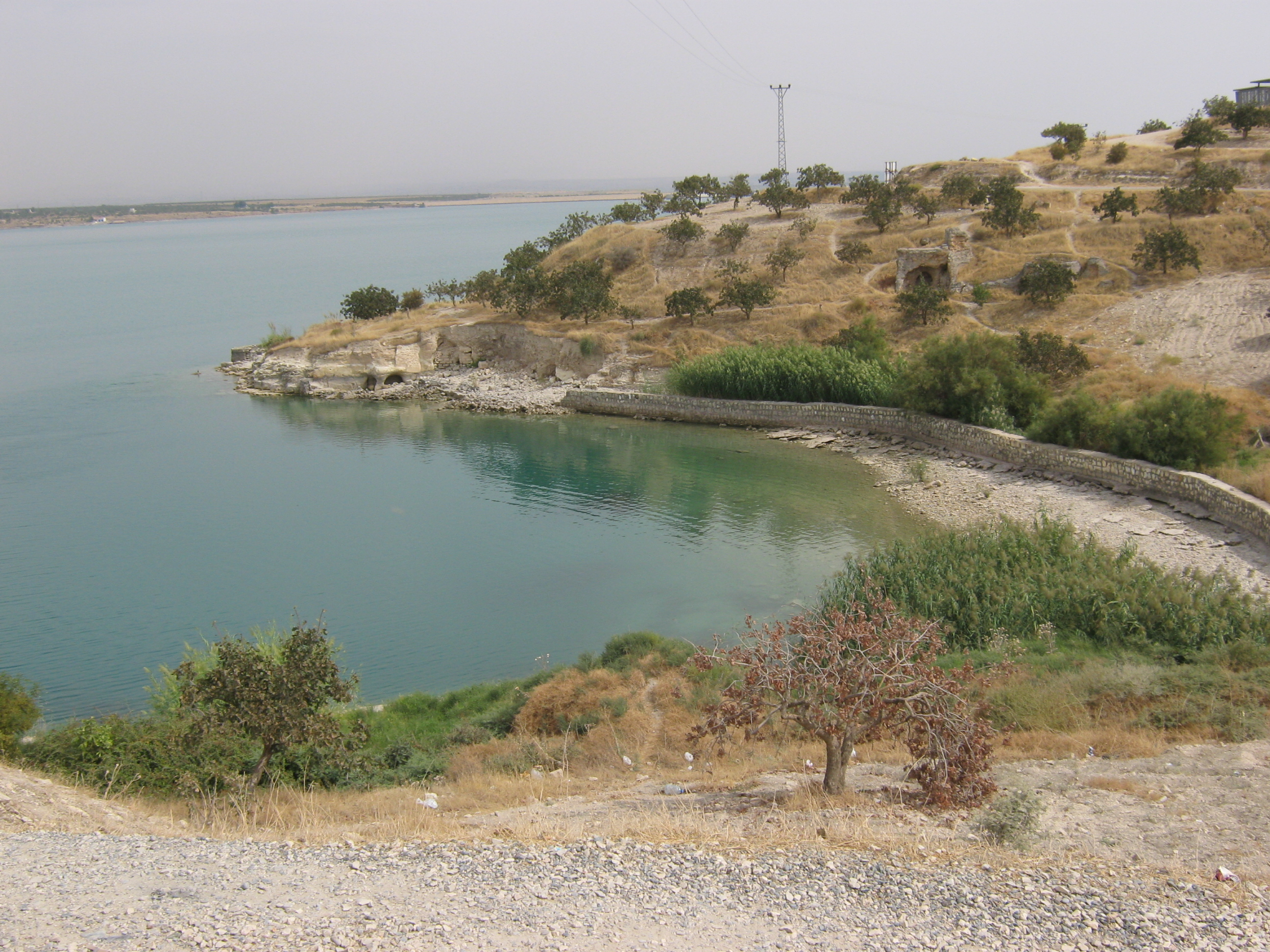
- Apamea lies below these waters

- Location within Turkey
- 37.0667°N 37.8836°E
- Location: Şanlıurfa Province, Turkey

Apamea or Apameia (Greek: Απάμεια, Syriac: ܐܦܡܝܐ) was a Hellenistic city on the left (viz., the eastern) bank of the Euphrates, opposite the famous city of Zeugma, at the end of a bridge of boats (Greek: Ζεῦγμα zeugma) connecting the two, founded by Seleucus I Nicator (Pliny, v. 21). The city was rebuilt by Seleucus I. The site, once partially covered by the village of Tilmusa (now Keskince), Şanlıurfa Province, Turkey, is now flooded by the lake formed by the Birecik Dam (Birejik Dam).

The ancient term Zeugma actually referred to the twin cities on the opposing banks of the river. Today the name Zeugma is usually understood to refer to the settlement on the west bank, called Seleucia (Greek: Σελεύκεια) after the founder, while the one on the East bank was called Apamea after his Persian wife Apama.

== See also ==
- List of ancient Greek cities
