= Battle of the Oenoparus =

145 BCE battle of the Syrian Wars

Battle of the Oenoparus river
- Part of Syrian Wars
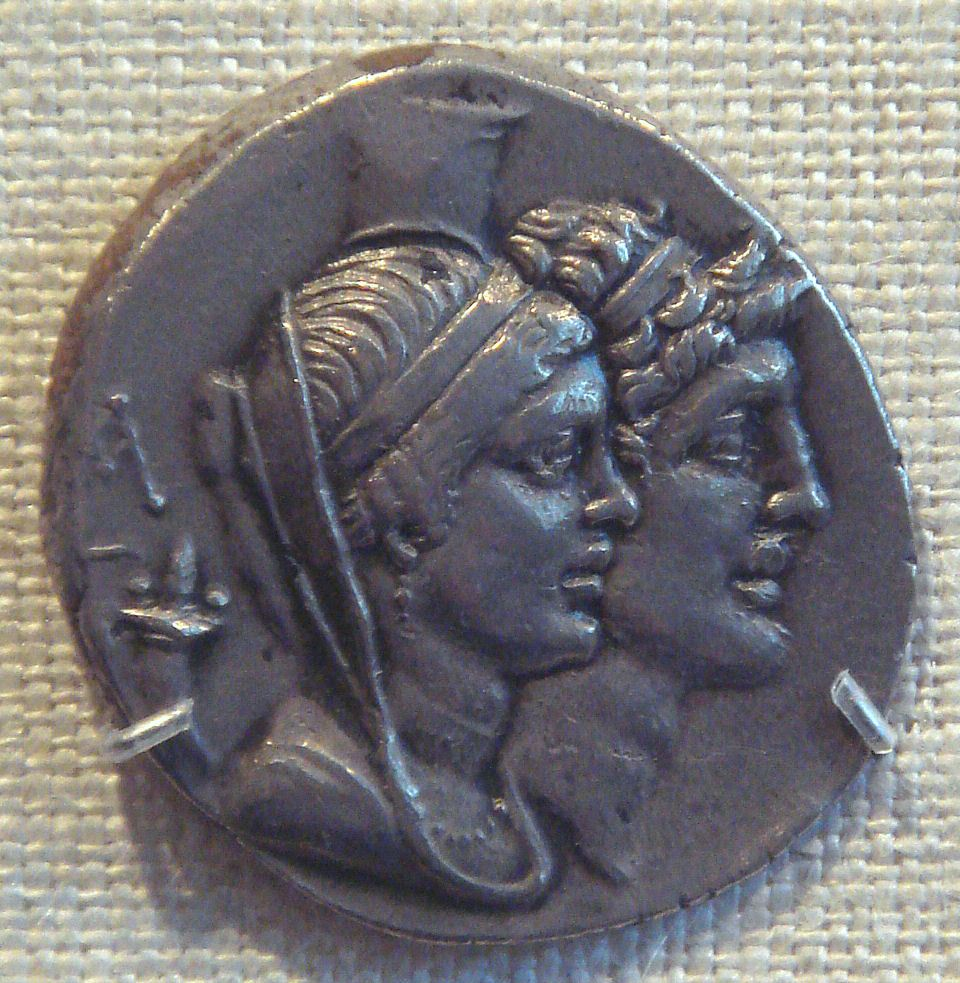
- Alexander I Balas and Cleopatra Thea.
Date	145 BC
Location	Antioch, Seleucid Empire (modern-day Antakya, Hatay, Turkey)
Result	Victory of Demetrius and Ptolemy

Belligerents
Ptolemaic Egypt and Seleucid Empire (partisans of Demetrius)	Seleucid Empire (partisans of Alexander)

Commanders and leaders
Ptolemy VI (DOW); Demetrius II	Alexander Balas

The Battle of the Oenoparus took place in 145 BC on the Oenoparus river (the modern Afrin River, Syria) in the adjoining countryside of Antioch on the Orontes, the capital of the Seleucid Empire. It was fought between a coalition of Ptolemaic Egypt led by Ptolemy VI and Seleucids who favored the royal claim of Demetrius II Nicator against Seleucids who favored the claim of Alexander Balas. Both the Seleucid Empire and the Ptolemaic kingdom were diadochi, Greek-ruled successor states established after the conquests of Alexander the Great.

The Ptolemaic force won the battle, and Balas's hopes of securing the throne were ended. However, King Ptolemy VI suffered a mortal wound in the battle. Despite the Egyptian forces winning the battle, they too would be driven out of Syria by the now unified Seleucid Empire under Demetrius II, which turned on the leaderless Egyptian force and drove them out of Seleucid territory.

== Background ==
King Demetrius I Soter of the Seleucid Empire was ambitious and competent, but made enemies during his reign, both external and internal. The Roman Republic and the Kingdom of Pergamon, eager to weaken Demetrius and the Seleucids, backed a rival claimant to the Seleucid throne: Alexander Balas. Balas claimed to be a lost child of Antiochus IV Epiphanes, Demetrius I's uncle, and landed in the city of Ptolemais in 152 BC, backed by Roman and Pergamese funded mercenaries. He secured the aid of at least some internal rivals to Demetrius, notably including the Maccabees led by Jonathan Apphus, whom he appointed as high priest of Judea. Balas and his faction succeeded in killing Demetrius I in 150 BC and claimed the Seleucid throne for himself. Alexander Balas initially had the support of Ptolemaic Egypt and its king Ptolemy VI Philometor; he married Ptolemy's daughter Cleopatra Thea to create an alliance.

However, this peace was not to last. Demetrius II, Demetrius I's young son, made a play to overthrow Balas, who gained a reputation as a weak and immoral ruler (whether deserved or not). The civil war resumed, and Egyptian forces massed on the border around 147 BC, ready to intervene in the Seleucid civil war. With Alexander's permission, the Egyptians occupied much of coastal Coele-Syria, with the cooperation of Alexander's Jewish allies who expanded and took over more of the Judean hills and interior. As Ptolemy VI marched north, he switched sides and demanded his son-in-law Balas hand over his chief minister on likely faked charges. Possibly Demetrius II had offered to legitimize long-term Ptolemaic rule of Coele-Syria if he switched to aiding his faction. Ptolemy VI now marched on Antioch; Alexander abandoned the city, apparently disliking his chances in a siege, and left north for Cilicia in Asia Minor. Ptolemy VI had conquered the capital of Syria, with Demetrius II as a puppet ruler; his daughter Cleopatra Thea had her marriage with Balas annulled, and she was remarried to the new king.

== Battle ==
Ptolemy VI and Demetrius II worked on securing the loyalty of the notable Greek citizens of Antioch. Meanwhile, Balas left Cilicia and re-entered Syria; his supporters pillaged the countryside around Antioch to put pressure on the Egyptian invaders, as his strategic standing had deteriorated to the point where provoking a pitched battle was his last viable option. The joint army of Ptolemy VI and Demetrius II rode out north to attack Alexander and put an end to his raids. The coalition army clashed with Alexander's army by the Oenoparus river near Antioch. The Ptolemaic army prevailed, forcing Balas to flee.

== Aftermath ==
While the Ptolemaic army won, both Balas and Ptolemy VI lost. Ptolemy VI was mortally wounded in the battle, despite his side winning; his horse fell on him, apparently after being frightened by an elephant. He did not perish immediately; he was protected by his guards and sent back to Egypt in a dazed stupor.

Alexander Balas fled to Nabataea for refuge where he had sent his son for safekeeping earlier, but was betrayed by his allies there. Ancient sources disagree as to exactly who; he was either murdered by a Nabataean prince named Zabdiel, who cut off his head to curry favor with Ptolemy VI, or by two of his own officers named Heliades and Casius to gain the favor of Demetrius II.

The unexpected winner of the battle was thus the young Demetrius II who suddenly found his potential rivals for authority both dead. With the Seleucids briefly unified, Demetrius II turned on his former Egyptian allies and was able to drive the Ptolemaic occupation force out of Antioch and Coele-Syria. Ptolemaic Egypt - which had seemingly made major territorial gains and reduced its long-time rival to a client state - was back controlling the same territory it had in 152 BC. While Ptolemy VI's allies briefly ruled as regent, his brother Ptolemy VIII Physcon was eventually invited back to Alexandria to succeed him.

== See also ==
- Syrian Wars, a set of wars over the centuries between the Seleucid and Ptolemaic states, generally over control of Coele-Syria
