= Demetrius II Nicator =

Seleucid King of Syria from 145 to 138 BC

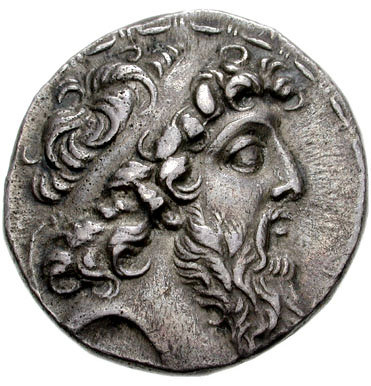

Basileus of the Seleucid Empire
- Reign: September 145 – July/August 138 BC
- Predecessor: Alexander Balas
- Successor: Diodotus Tryphon
- Reign: 129–125 BC
- Predecessor: Antiochus VII Sidetes
- Successor: Alexander II Zabinas or Cleopatra Thea
- Born: c. 160 BC
- Died: 125 BC (aged 35)
- Spouse: Cleopatra Thea; Rhodogune of Parthia (married 138–131 BC)
- Issue: Seleucus V Philometor; Antiochus VIII Grypus; Laodice
- Dynasty: Seleucid
- Father: Demetrius I Soter
- Mother: Laodice V?

Demetrius II Nicator (Ancient Greek: Δημήτριος Β`, Dēmḗtrios B; Ancient Greek: Νικάτωρ, Nikátōr, "Victor"; died 125 BC) was one of the sons of Demetrius I Soter. His mother may have been Laodice V, as was the case with his brother Antiochus VII Sidetes. Demetrius ruled the Seleucid Empire for two periods, separated by a number of years of captivity in Hyrcania in Parthia, first from September 145 BC to July/August 138 BC, and again from 129 BC until his death in 125 BC. His brother Antiochus VII ruled the Seleucid Empire in the interim between his two reigns.

== Early life ==
When he was a young boy, Demetrius' father Demetrius I fought Alexander Balas for control of the Seleucid throne. Somewhat surprisingly, Balas won, and Demetrius' father, mother, and older brother were all killed. The young Demetrius II fled to Crete, where he was raised by his guardians.

== First reign (147–139 BC) ==
=== Victory over Alexander Balas ===
In 147 BC, while Alexander Balas was occupied with a revolt in Cilicia, Demetrius returned to Syria with a force of Cretan mercenaries led by a man called Lasthenes. In 145 BC Ptolemy VI Philometor, king of Egypt, marched an army into Syria ostensibly in support of Alexander Balas, but he soon switched his support to Demetrius, perhaps after receiving an offer to formalize the Ptolemaic occupation of Coele-Syria. Ptolemy sealed the alliance by divorcing his daughter Cleopatra Thea from Alexander and remarrying her to Demetrius. Shortly after, Antioch surrendered to the Egyptian forces and offered the kingship to Ptolemy VI. However, he insisted Demetrius would become king, believing that Rome would not tolerate the unification of Egypt and Syria. Ptolemy pledged to serve as "a tutor in goodness and a guide" to Demetrius II. He probably intended for Demetrius to serve as a puppet ruler.

Alexander returned from Cilicia with his army, but Ptolemy VI and Demetrius II defeated his forces at Battle of the Oenoparus river. Alexander then fled to Arabia, where he was killed. Ptolemy was wounded in the battle and died three days later. With both his rival and his self-appointed guardian gone, Demetrius took the opportunity to assert his control over his kingdom. By late 145, Demetrius II had expelled all Ptolemaic troops from Syria and reasserted Seleucid control by leading his own forces all the way down to the Egyptian border.

=== Antiochene riots ===
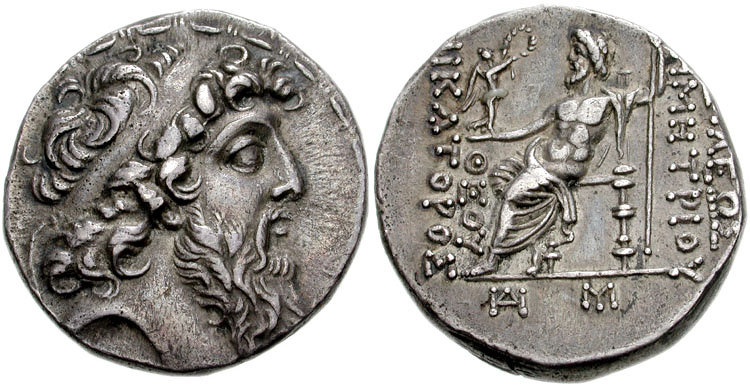
Coin of Demetrius II. The reverse shows Zeus bearing Nike. The Greek inscription reads ΒΑΣΙΛΕΩΣ ΔΗΜΗΤΡΙΟΥ ΘΕΟΥ ΝΙΚΑΤΟΡΟΣ, i.e. "of God King Demetrius, the Victor ". The date ΔΠΡ is year 184 of the Seleucid era, corresponding to 129–128 BC.

However, new troubles soon arose. Once he had expelled the Egyptian forces, he demobilised a large portion of his army. It appears that his financial situation led him to cut the soldiers' wages and debase the coinage. Demetrius had also punished the city of Antioch severely for having supported Alexander against his father and for speaking to him disrespectfully. He disarmed the citizens and the Cretan mercenaries under Lasthenes slaughtered those who resisted, including women and children. This led the Antiochenes to rise up and besiege Demetrius in his palace. Jewish troops violently restored Demetrius' control, burning down a large portion of the city in the process. This left the city even more hostile to him.

=== Rebellion of Diodotus ===
In order to secure his hold on power, Demetrius had eliminated officials associated with Alexander Balas. One of these officials, the general Diodotus, fled into Arabia, where he secured the infant son of Alexander Balas with Cleopatra Thea and proclaimed him king as Antiochus VI Dionysus. Many of Demetrius' soldiers defected to Diodotus, out of anger at his conduct or the cuts to their pay. Demetrius was defeated in battle and lost control of Apamea and Antioch to Diodotus. Numismatic evidence indicates that Apamea was lost in early 144 and Antioch in late 144 or early 143.

Demetrius proved unable to retake the capital, instead establishing himself in Seleucia Pieria. Antiochus VI died in 142 or 141, and Diodotus made himself king as Tryphon. The division of the kingdom between Demetrius in Seleucia and Diodotus in Antioch persisted. Initially, Diodotus succeeded in bringing the leader of the Jews, Jonathan Apphus, onto his side, but this relationship broke down; ultimately Diodotus captured and executed Jonathan. By means of adroit diplomacy and grants of extensive freedoms, Demetrios II was able to secure Jonathan's brother Simon Thassi as a close ally. These grants were later seen by the Hasmonean Jewish state as the moment when they achieved full independence.

=== Parthian war and captivity (139–130 BC) ===
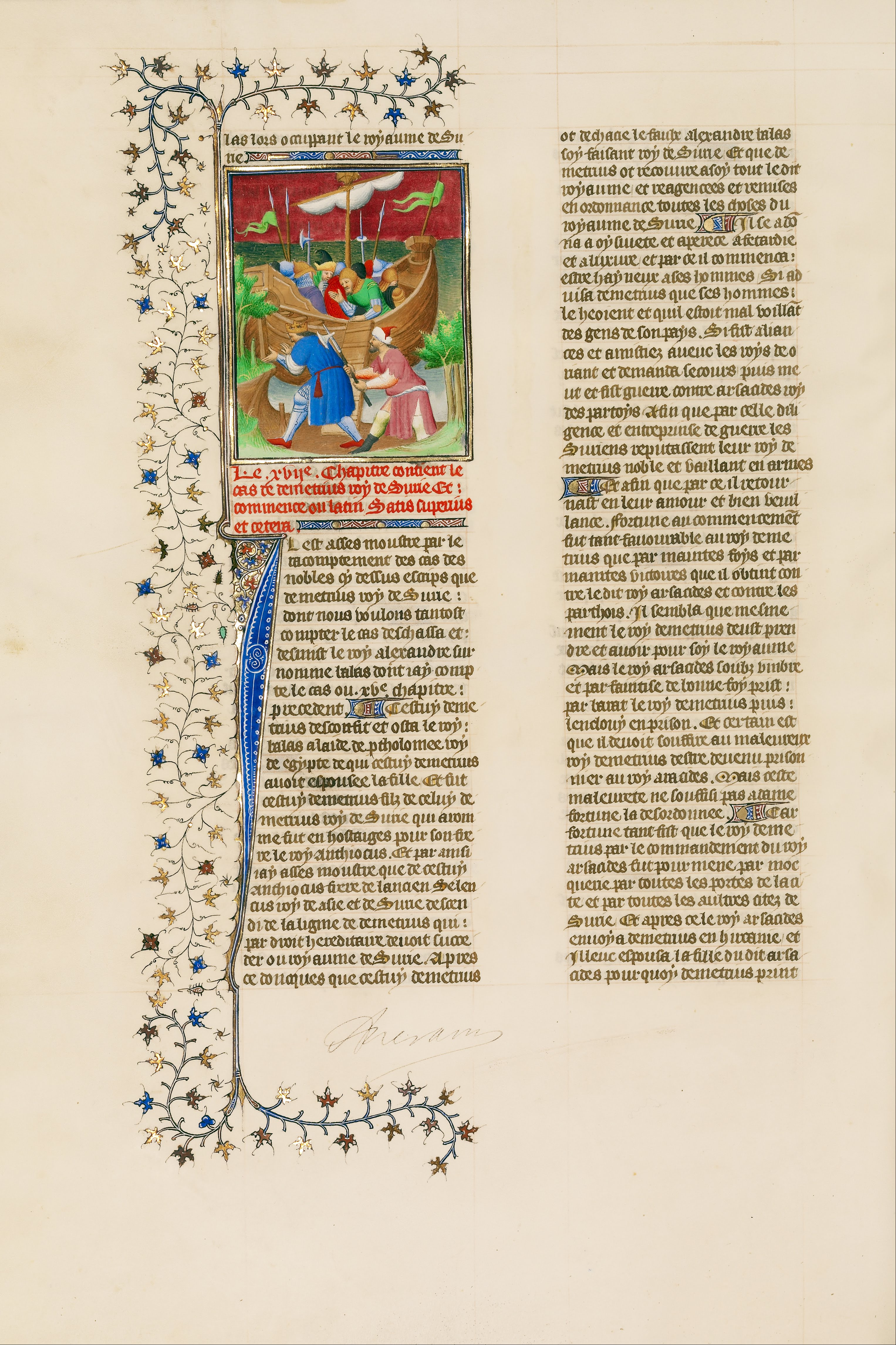
Demetrius Nicator, King of Syria, Killed as He Attempts to Land at Tyre

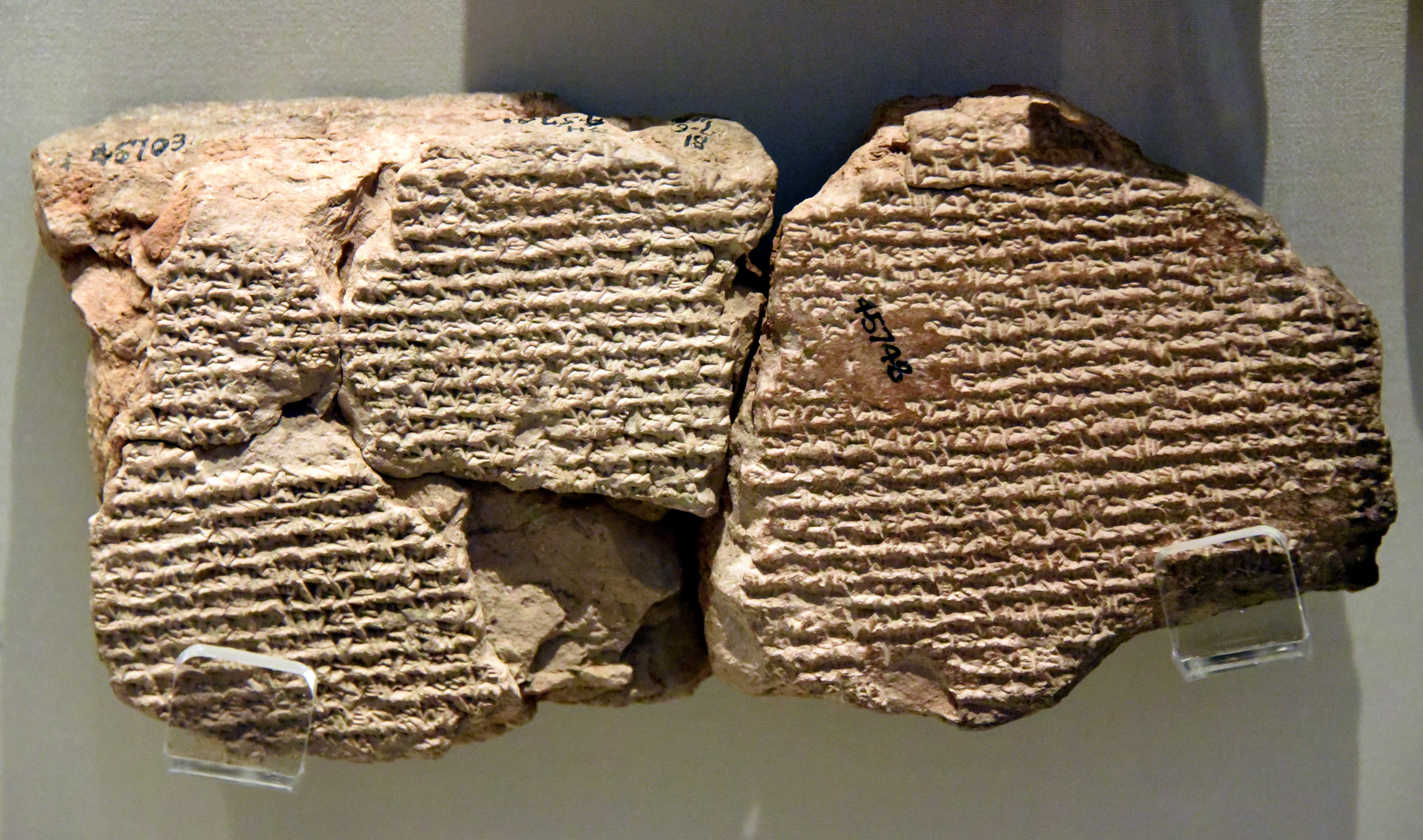
Parthian conquest of Babylonia, the defeat of the Seleucid king Demetrius II Nicator by the Parthian ruler Mithradates I in 141 BCE. From Babylon, Iraq. British Museum

Mithridates I, king of Parthia had taken advantage of the conflict between Demetrius and Tryphon to seize control of Susa and Elymais in 144 and of Mesopotamia in mid-141 BC. In 139/8, Demetrius journeyed east to reclaim these territories from the Parthians. As late as 140 vassal rulers of Persis, Elam, and even Bactria sent auxiliary troops (mostly persians and babylonians) to support Demetrius II in his war against the Parthians.

He was initially successful, but was defeated in the Iranian mountains and taken prisoner in July or August of 138 BC. Parthian control of Mesopotamia was thus reaffirmed. In Syria, Tryphon was briefly left as uncontested ruler of the remaining Seleucid territories, but the Seleucid dynasty's grip was reestablished under Antiochus VII Sidetes, the younger brother of Demetrius, who also married Cleopatra Thea.

King Mithridates had kept Demetrius II alive and even married him to a Parthian princess named Rhodogune, with whom he had children. However, Demetrius was restless and twice tried to escape from his exile in Hyrcania on the shores of the Caspian Sea, once with the help of his friend Kallimander, who had gone to great lengths to rescue the king: he had travelled incognito through Babylonia and Parthia. When the two friends were captured, the Parthian king did not punish Kallimander but rewarded him for his fidelity to Demetrius. The second time Demetrius was captured when he tried to escape, Mithridates humiliated him by giving him a golden set of dice, thus hinting that Demetrius II was a restless child who needed toys. It was however for political reasons that the Parthians treated Demetrius II kindly.

In 130 BC Antiochus Sidetes felt secure enough to march against Parthia, and scored massive initial successes. Now Phraates II made what he thought was a powerful move: he released Demetrius, hoping that the two brothers would start a civil war. However, Sidetes was defeated soon after his brother's release and never met him. Phraates II sent people to pursue Demetrius, but he managed to safely return home to Syria and regained his throne and his queen as well.

== Second reign (130–125 BC) ==
However, the Seleucid kingdom was now but a shadow of its former glory, and Demetrius had a hard time ruling. Notably, his first wife Cleopatra Thea detested her returned husband. He was apparently unpopular, perhaps from memories of his humiliating defeat and general discontent with the decline of the Empire, and perhaps from resentment that he had lived while so many Seleucid soldiers and family members sent to Parthia had died. To the good luck of Demetrius, however, Phraates II was faced by an invasion from Sakan nomads to his east. The Parthians attempted to use captured Greeks against the Saka, but they mostly defected, and Phraates was killed in battle. The next Parthian king, Artabanus, also had a short and violent reign fighting in the east rather than to Parthia's west. This gave the Seleucid Empire a temporary reprieve from the Parthian threat.

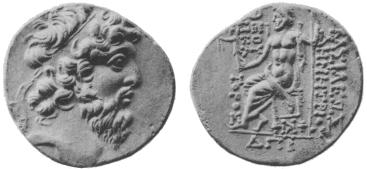
Coin of Demetrius II Nicator, showing the king with a beard and diadem. The reverse shows Zeus bearing Nike. The Greek inscription reads: ΒΑΣΙΛΕΩΣ ΔΗΜΗΤΡΙΟΥ ΘΕΟΥ ΝΙΚΑΤΟΡΟΣ, Basileōs Dēmētriou Theou Nikatoros, "of God King Demetrius, the Victor."

At the time in Ptolemaic Egypt, a power struggle developed between Queen Cleopatra II and her brother king Ptolemy VIII. Cleopatra had the support of the Greek administration in the capital Alexandria, while Ptolemy VIII had the support of the countryside and native Egyptians. Cleopatra II might have sent out a request for aid to Demetrius II, or he might have gotten an impression from travelers and spies that Ptolemy VIII's government was weak. Around 128 BC, Demetrius II mounted a military expedition to Egypt to "save" Cleopatra II. Ancient sources roundly condemn Demetrius II for this action as foolish when so many problems were on-going for the Seleucid Empire. A modern historian, John Grainger, defends it as a reasonable gamble: small forces had set off waves of defections before in recent history, so if Ptolemy VIII was truly as unpopular as reported, it might work. More generally, the geopolitical situation for both the Seleucids and Ptolemys was desperate enough that uniting the remaining great Greek states might be the only way for them to maintain their relevance, given that Antigonid Macedonia had been crushed by Rome in the preceding decades. Regardless, the gamble backfired. Demetrius II camped outside the fortress of Pelusium, the gateway to Egypt, but Ptolemy VIII's troops remained loyal; there was no mass defection. It was Demetrius' own troops that mutinied in the dry desert. King Ptolemy VIII reacted by finding another potential Seleucid royal claimant to undermine the obviously hostile Demetrius II. He found and sent a man named Alexander II Zabinas, the alleged illegitimate son of Alexander Balas, to fight a civil war against Demetrius, backed by the Ptolemies.

The remainder of Demetrius' reign would be spent fighting a slowly losing battle against Alexander II. He retained the loyalty of Coele-Syria and Cilica, but not the capital Antioch. In 126 BC, Demetrius was defeated in a battle at Damascus. He fled to Ptolemais but his wife Cleopatra Thea closed the gates against him. He was captured and then killed on a ship near Tyre, after his wife had deserted him and he was denied temple asylum.

He was succeeded by the victorious usurper, Alexander II, while his queen, Cleopatra Thea, ruled in Ptolemais Akko in co-regency with two of their sons, Seleucus V Philometor and Antiochus VIII Grypus.

== In opera ==
Incidents from the life of Demetrius II Nicator and Cleopatra Thea are the basis of the libretto Demetrio by Pietro Metastasio. First set by the composer Antonio Caldara for the imperial court of Vienna in 1731, it was one of Metastasio's most popular librettos, eventually set by dozens of 18th-century composers up to the year 1790.

== See also ==
- List of Syrian monarchs
- Timeline of Syrian history

== Sources ==
- Chrubasik, Boris (2016). Kings and Usurpers in the Seleukid Empire: The Men who would be King. Oxford: Oxford University Press. ISBN 9780198786924.
- Grainger, John D. (2010). The Syrian Wars. Brill. ISBN 9789004180505.

Demetrius II Nicator Seleucid dynasty Born: Unknown Died: 125 BC
Preceded by Alexander Balas	Seleucid King (King of Syria); 146–139 BC with Antiochus VI Dionysus (145–142 BC); Diodotus Tryphon (142–139 BC)	Succeeded by Antiochus VII Sidetes
Preceded by Antiochus VII Sidetes	Seleucid King (King of Syria); 129–126 BC with Alexander II Zabinas (129–123 BC)	Succeeded by Cleopatra Thea
