= Alexander Balas =

Seleucid King of Syria from 150 to 142 BC

Alexander I Balas
- King of Syria
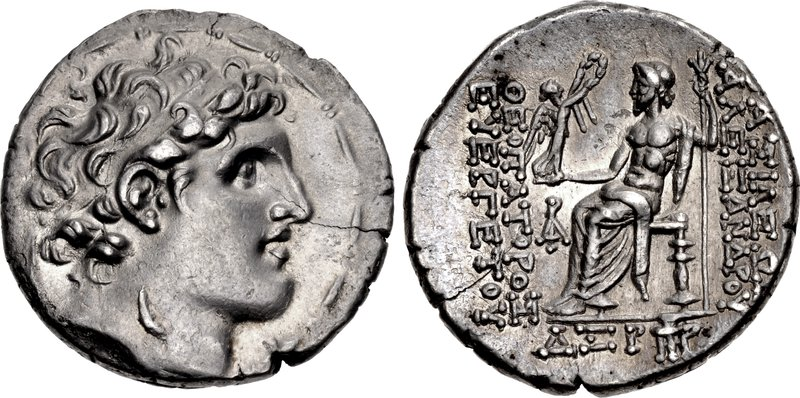
- Coin of Alexander I Balas, Antioch mint

Basileus of the Seleucid Empire
- Reign: 150 BC – August 145 BC
- Predecessor: Demetrius I Soter
- Successors: Demetrius II Nicator or Antiochus VI Dionysus
- Born: Smyrna (now İzmir, Turkey)
- Died: August 145 BC
- Spouse: Cleopatra Thea
- Issue: Antiochus VI Dionysus (first son with Cleopatra Thea)
- Dynasty: Seleucid
- Father: Antiochus IV Epiphanes (unconfirmed)
- Mother: Laodice IV (unconfirmed)

Alexander I Theopator Euergetes, who used the epitaph Balas (Ancient Greek: Ἀλέξανδρος Βάλας, romanized: Alexandros Balas), was the ruler of the Seleucid Empire from 150 BC to August 145 BC. Picked from obscurity and supported by the neighboring Roman-allied Kingdom of Pergamon, Alexander landed in Phoenicia in 152 BC and started a civil war against Seleucid king Demetrius I Soter. Backed by mercenaries and factions of the Seleucid Empire unhappy with the existing government, he defeated Demetrius and took the crown in 150 BC. He married the princess Cleopatra Thea to seal an alliance with the neighboring Ptolemaic kingdom. His reign saw the steady retreat of the Seleucid Empire's eastern border, with important eastern satrapies such as Media being lost to the nascent Parthian Empire. In 147 BC, Demetrius II Nicator, the young son of Demetrius I, began a campaign to overthrow Balas, and civil war resumed. Alexander's ally, Ptolemaic king Ptolemy VI Philometor, moved troops into Coele-Syria to support Alexander, but then switched sides and threw his support behind Demetrius II. At the Battle of the Oenoparus River in Syria, he was defeated by Ptolemy VI and he died shortly afterward.

== Life ==
=== Origins and mission to Rome ===
Alexander Balas claimed to be the son of Antiochus IV Epiphanes and Laodice IV and heir to the Seleucid throne. The ancient historians Polybius and Diodorus say that this claim was false and that he and his sister Laodice VI were really natives of Smyrna of humble origin. However, Polybius became friends with Balas's rival King Demetrius I when both were hostages in Rome, so Polybius is not an unbiased source on this matter. Modern scholars disagree about whether the story of Attalus finding a commoner who looked the part is true or was propaganda put about by Alexander's opponents.

According to Diodorus, Alexander was originally put forward as a candidate for the Seleucid throne by Attalus II of Pergamum. Attalus had been disturbed by the Seleucid king Demetrius I's interference in Cappadocia, where he had dethroned king Ariarathes V. Boris Chrubasik is sceptical, noting that there is little subsequent evidence for Attalid involvement with Alexander. However, Selene Psoma has proposed that a large set of coins minted in a number of cities under Attalid control in this period was produced by Attalus II in order to fund Alexander's bid for the kingship.

Alexander and his sister were maintained in Cilicia by Heracleides, a former minister of Antiochus IV and brother of Timarchus, an usurper in Media who had been executed by the reigning king Demetrius I Soter. In 153 BC, Heracleides brought Alexander and his sister to Rome, where he presented Alexander to the Roman Senate, which recognised him as the legitimate Seleucid king and agreed to support him in his bid to take the throne. Polybius mentions that Attalus II and Demetrius I also met with the Senate at this time but does not state how this was connected to the recognition of Alexander - if at all.

=== War with Demetrius I (152–150 BC) ===
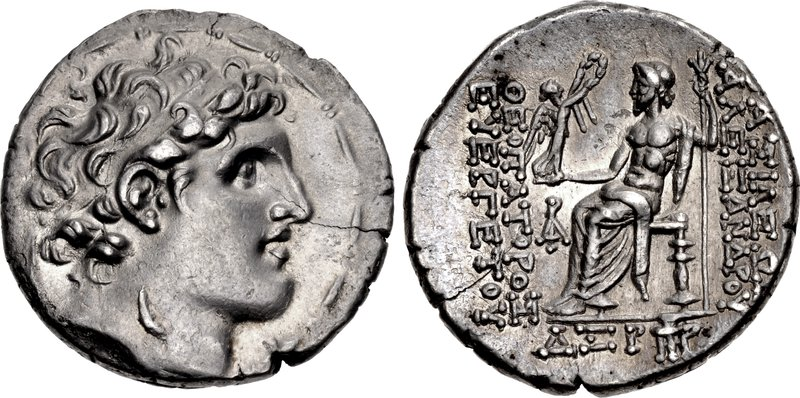
Silver coin of Alexander I "Balas". The Greek inscription reads ΒΑΣΙΛΕΩΣ ΑΛΕΧΑΝΔΡΟΥ (king Alexander). The date ΓΞΡ is year 164 of the Seleucid era, corresponding to 149–148 BC.

After recruiting mercenaries, Alexander and Heracleides departed to Ephesus. From there, they invaded Phoenicia by sea, seizing Ptolemais Akko. Numismatic evidence shows that Alexander had also gained control of Seleucia Pieria, Byblos, Beirut and Tyre by 151 BC. On this coinage, Alexander heavily advertised his (claimed) connection to Antiochus IV, depicting Zeus Nicephorus on his coinage as Antiochus had done. He also assumed the title of Theopator ('Divinely Fathered'), which recalled Antiochus' epithet Theos Epiphanes ('God Manifest'). The coinage also presented Alexander Balas in the guise of Alexander the Great, with pronounced facial features and long flowing hair. This was intended to emphasise his military prowess to his soldiers. While his adopted epitaph "Balas" was not inscribed on his coins, it is a derivation from the name of the Semitic deity Ba'al, and another indication of his efforts to present himself as the living embodiment of the gods.

Alexander and Demetrius I competed with another to win over Jonathan Apphus, the leader of the ascendant faction in Judaea. Jonathan was won over to Alexander's side by the grant of a high position in the Seleucid court and the high priesthood in Jerusalem. Reinforced by Jonathan's hardened soldiers, Alexander fought a decisive battle with Demetrius in July 150 BC, in which Demetrius was killed. By autumn, Alexander's kingship was recognised throughout the Seleucid realm.

=== Reign (150–147 BC) ===
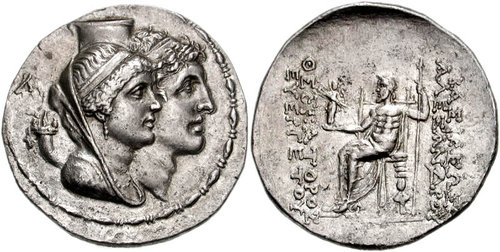
Marriage commemorative of Alexander I Balas and Cleopatra Thea.

Alexander gained control of Antioch at this time and his chancellor, Ammonius, murdered all the courtiers of Demetrius I, as well as his wife Laodice and his eldest son Antigonus. Ptolemy VI Philometor of Egypt entered into an alliance with Alexander, which was sealed by Alexander's marriage to his daughter Cleopatra Thea. The wedding took place at Ptolemais, with Ptolemy VI and Jonathan Apphus in attendance. Alexander took the opportunity to shower honours on Jonathan, whom he treated as his main agent in Judaea. The marriage was advertised by a special coinage issue, depicting the royal pair side by side - only the second depiction of a queen on Seleucid coinage. She is shown with divine attributes (a cornucopia and a calathus) and is depicted in front of the king. Some scholars have seen Alexander as little more than a Ptolemaic puppet, arguing that this coinage emphasises Cleopatra's dominance over him and that the chancellor Ammonius was a Ptolemaic agent. Other scholars argue that the alliance was advertised as an important one, but that the arguments for Alexander's subservience have been overstated.

=== Collapse of the East ===
Meanwhile, the Seleucid positions in the eastern Upper Satrapies, already weakened by the previous kings' failure to contain the Parthians and the Greco-Bactrians, suffered almost complete collapse. The Parthians under Mithridates I took advantage of the general instability to invade Media. The region had been lost to Seleucid control by the middle of 148 BC. At around the same time the local nobles in Elymais and Persis asserted their own ephemeral independence, only to be soon also subdued by the Parthians. By 148 BC at the latest the Parthians also secured their hold over Hyrcania at the coast of the Caspian Sea. By 147 BC the Parthians stood at the doorsteps of Babylonia, one of the Seleucid empire's hearthlands and location of one of its two capital cities, Seleucia-on-Tigris.

Alexander is not recorded to do anything of note to stem the steady erosion of Seleucid power in the East. Ancient historians hostile to him depict him as too distracted by a life of debauchery to take action to stop the Parthians, unlike earlier Seleucid Kings who would mount expeditions to the eastern satrapies to deter the Parthians. He was reputed to hand the administration over to two commanders, Hierax and Diodotus, neither of whom seemed to care for anything but their own interests. This representation is at least partially a product of his opponents' propaganda, but it is true that under Alexander, the Seleucid Empire continued to see its reach and power slip away.

=== War with Demetrius II and death (147–145 BC) ===
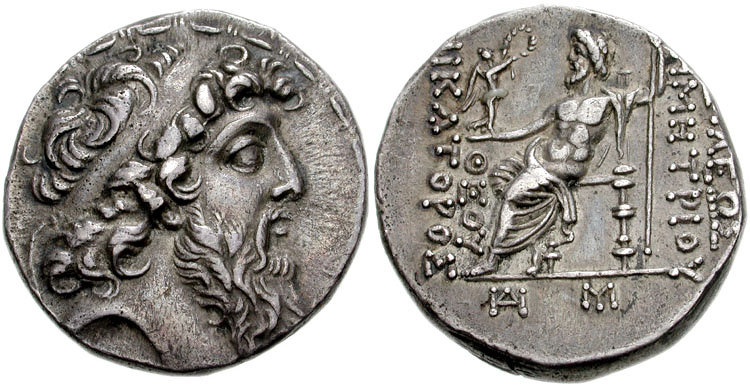
Coin of Demetrius II Nicator

In early 147 BC Demetrius' son Demetrius II returned to Syria with a force of Cretan mercenaries led by a man called Lasthenes. Much of Coele Syria was lost to him immediately, possibly as a result of the succession of the regional commander. Jonathan attacked Demetrius's position from the south, seizing Jaffa and Ashdod, while Alexander Balas was occupied with a revolt in Cilicia. In 145 BC Ptolemy VI of Egypt invaded Syria, ostensibly in support of Alexander Balas. In practice, Ptolemy's intervention came at a heavy cost; with Alexander's permission, he took control of all the Seleucid cities along the coast, including Seleucia Pieria. He may also have started minting his own coinage in the Syrian cities.

While he was at Ptolemais Akko, however, Ptolemy switched sides. According to Josephus, Ptolemy discovered that Alexander's chancellor, Ammonius, had been plotting to assassinate him, but when he demanded that Ammonius be punished, Alexander refused. Ptolemy remarried his daughter Cleopatra Thea to Demetrius II and continued his march northward. Alexander's commanders of Antioch, Diodotus and Hierax, surrendered the city to Ptolemy.

Alexander returned from Cilicia with his army, but Ptolemy VI and Demetrius II defeated his forces in a Battle of the Oenoparus River. Earlier, Alexander had sent his infant son Antiochus to an Arabian dynast called Zabdiel Diocles. Alexander now fled to Arabia in order to join up with Zabdiel, but he was killed. Sources disagree about whether the killer was a pair of his own generals who had decided to switch sides or Zabdiel himself. Alexander's severed head was brought to Ptolemy, who also died shortly after from wounds sustained in the battle.

Zabdiel continued to look after Alexander's infant son Antiochus, until 145 BC when the general Diodotus declared him king, in order to serve as the figurehead of a rebellion against Demetrius II. In 130 BC, another claimant to the throne, Alexander Zabinas, would also claim to be Alexander Balas' son; almost certainly spuriously. Alexander is the title character of the oratorio Alexander Balus, written in 1747 by George Frideric Handel.

== Epithets ==
On some of his coins he is called "Epiphanes" (splendid, glorious) and "Nicephorus" (bringer of victory) after his pretended father and on others "Euergetes" (benefactor) and "Theopator" (of divine descent). In Septuagint it was also called "Epiphanes".

== See also ==
- List of Syrian monarchs
- Timeline of Syrian history
- Diophantus of Abae

== Bibliography ==
Primary

- 1 Maccabees 10 ff.
- Justin xxxv. 1 and 2
- Josephus. Antiquities of the Jews. 13.2.1..
- Appian, Syrian Wars (=Roman History book 11), 67
- Polybius, Histories xxxiii. 14.

Secondary

- Maas, Anthony John (1907). "Alexander" . In Herbermann, Charles (ed.). Catholic Encyclopedia. Vol. 1. New York: Robert Appleton Company.
- Mørkholm, Otto (1981). "Sculpture and Coins: the Portrait of Alexander Balas of Syria". Numismatica e Antichità Classiche. 10. Industria Grafica Gaggini-Bizzozero. ISSN 1420-1739. OCLC 715323965.
- Chrubasik, Boris (2016). Kings and Usurpers in the Seleukid Empire: The Men who would be King. Oxford: Oxford University Press. ISBN 9780198786924.
- Rawlinson, George (1867). The Seven Great Monarchies Of The Ancient Eastern World, Vol 5: Persia.

Alexander Balas Seleucid dynasty Born: Unknown Died: 146 BC
Preceded by Demetrius I Soter	Seleucid King (King of Syria); 150–146 BC	Succeeded by Demetrius II Nicator or Antiochus VI Dionysus
