= Rezon the Syrian =

Enemy of King Solomon mentioned in 1 Kings

King of Aram Damascus
- Reign: 10th century BCE
- Predecessor: Hadadezer (Aram-Zobah)
- Successor: Hezion or Tabrimmon
- Father: Eliada

Rezon the Syrian, also named "Ezron", was an enemy of King Solomon mentioned in 1 Kings 11. Some 19th-century scholars considered Rezon to be the throne name of King Hezion. He is known only from the Hebrew Bible.

== Biography ==
He was son of Eliada, and had previously deserted Hadadezer king of Zobah, presumably when the men of Damascus came to Hadadezer's aid. After Hadadezer's death Rezon became king in Damascus and, like Hadad the Edomite harried Israel's borders. Archaeology has not confirmed his identity. One solution, popular in the late 19th century, was identification of Rezon as the throne name of Hezion, the grandfather of Ben-Hadad I, who was a contemporary of Asa, King of Judah (1 Kings 15:18).

== See also ==
- List of Syrian monarchs
- Timeline of Syrian history
- Aramean kings
