= List of Syrian monarchs =

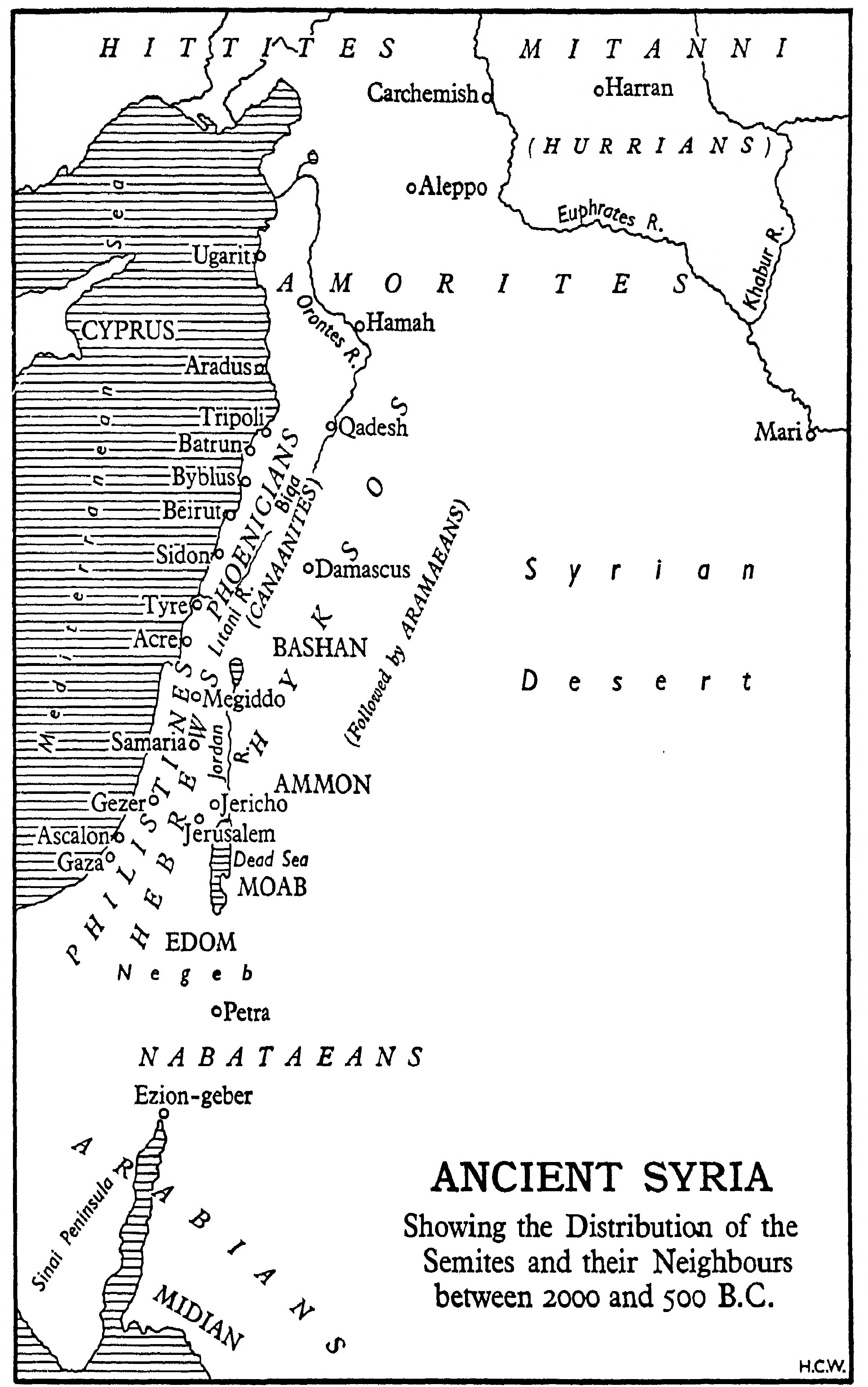
The region of Syria

The title King of Syria appeared in the second century BC in referring to the Seleucid kings who ruled the entirety of the region of Syria. It was also used to refer to Aramean kings in the Greek translations of the Old Testament, mainly indicating the kings of Aram-Damascus. Following the defeat of the Ottoman Empire in World War I, the region came under the rule of France, the United Kingdom and Prince Faisal of Hejaz, who was proclaimed King of Syria on 8 March 1920. Faisal's reign lasted a few months before he was overthrown by France and the title fell out of use.

== Background ==
The term Syria was first applied by Herodotus in the 5th century BC to indicate a region generally extending between Anatolia and Egypt. With the advent of the Hellenistic period, Greeks and their Seleucid dynasty used the term "Syria" to designate the region between the Mediterranean and the Euphrates. The usage of the name in referring to the region during the Iron Age (ended 586 BC) is a modern practice.

== List of monarchs ==
=== Seleucid dynasty ===
According to Polybius, King Antigonus I Monophthalmus established the Syrian kingdom which included Coele-Syria. The Seleucid king Antiochus III the Great defeated the Ptolemaic Kingdom in the Battle of Panium (200 BC); he annexed the Syrian lands controlled by Egypt (Coele-Syria) and united them with his Syrian lands, thus gaining control of the entirety of Syria. Starting from the 2nd century BC, ancient writers, such as Polybius and Posidonius, began referring to the Seleucid ruler as the king of Syria. The evidence for this title's usage by the kings is provided by the inscription of Antigonus son of Menophilus, who described himself as the "admiral of Alexander, king of Syria" (Alexander refers either to Alexander I Balas or Alexander II Zabinas).

Portrait	Monarch (and lifespan)	Reign	Consort (and tenure)	Parents, co-regents, and notes
	Antiochus III the Great (c. 241–187 BC)	200–187 BC	Laodice III (200–187 BC); Euboea (191–187 BC)	Son of Seleucus II Callinicus and Laodice II. He appointed his eldest son Antiochus, who preceded him in death, as co-king. (Note: Antiochus son of Antiochus III was made co-king in 209 BC and died in 193 BC.); Antiochus III's second wife is attested in the hostile work of Polybius and the story is debated. (Note: There is no reason to believe that Laodice III fell from grace as she survived her husband and was honoured throughout his and his successors reigns. Seleucid monarchs did not engage in polygamy and even the most hostile accounts, aside from the propagandistic work of Polybius, do not accuse Antiochus III with the act. Paul J. Kosmin suggests a solution for the problem of Antiochus' second wife; according to Polybius, Euboea was a name given by Antiochus to his second wife and it is the name of her island. Hence, in the view of Kosmin, by marrying this girl, Antiochus signified that he was marrying the island which the girl became its symbol.)
	Antiochus (221–193 BC)	200–193 BC	Laodice IV (196–193 BC)	Son and co-king of Antiochus III.
	Seleucus IV Philopator (c. 218–175 BC)	187–175 BC	Laodice IV (187–175 BC)	Son of Antiochus III and Laodice III. He married Laodice IV, his brother Antiochus' widow.
	Antiochus (c. 180–170 BC)	175–170 BC	Unmarried	Son of Seleucus IV and Laodice IV. The minister Heliodorus held real power, then Antiochus was made co-king by his uncle Antiochus IV. (Note: Antiochus was a child of 4 or 5 years when he ascended the throne. Heliodorus might have killed Seleucus IV, before being removed by Antiochus IV who kept his nephew as co-king before killing him in 170 BC.)
	Antiochus IV Epiphanes (c. 215–164 BC)	175–164 BC	Laodice IV (c. 175–c. 164 BC)	Son of Antiochus III and Laodice III. Married his brother's widow.
	Antiochus V Eupator (172–161 BC)	164–162 BC	Unmarried	Son of Antiochus IV Epiphanes and possibly Laodice IV. His regent Lysias held actual power.
	Demetrius I Soter (187–150 BC)	162–150 BC	Laodice V (161–150 BC)	Son of Seleucus IV and Laodice IV. Might have married his sister Laodice V, the former wife of Perseus of Macedon.
	Antiochus	150 BC		Known from a coin minted in the same year Demetrius I lost his throne; his identity is left to speculations. (Note: Fritz Heichelheim proposed three possibilities: Antiochus was Demetrius I's son Antigonus who assumed the dynastic name Antiochus, a pretender, or Demetrius I's youngest son Antiochus VII. Alfred Raymond Bellinger considered the suggestion of Antiochus VII the most credible.)
	Alexander I Balas ( –145 BC)	150–145 BC	Cleopatra Thea (150–145 BC)	Claimed to be a son of Antiochus IV. He could have been an illegitimate son of Antiochus by a concubine named Antiochis. (Note: Appian called Balas Alexandros Nothos (Alexander the bastard); this bastardy could have been the reason for the doubts ancient writers showed regarding Alexander's paternity.)
	Demetrius II Nicator ( –125 BC)	145–138 BC (first reign)	Cleopatra Thea (145–138 BC)	Son of Demetrius I and possibly Laodice V.; First reign; Ptolemy VI Philometor of Egypt divorced his daughter Cleopatra Thea from Alexander I and married her to Demetrius.
	Antiochus VI Dionysus (148 BC–142/141 BC)	144–142/141 BC	Unmarried	Son of Alexander I and Cleopatra Thea. Was proclaimed king against Demetrius II by general Diodotus Tryphon who held actual power and eventually killed Antiochus. (Note: Josephus placed Antiochus' murder after the end of Demetrius II's first reign and Diodorus Siculus placed the usurpation of Diodotus Tryphon in the consular year 138 BC. However, the last coins struk in Antiochus' name date to the year142/141 BC indicating that he was murdered around that time.)

=== Non-dynastic ===
Diodotus Tryphon, who opposed Demetrius II by raising Antiochus VI to the throne, killed his protege and declared himself king ruling until 138 when the Seleucids unified Syria again.

Portrait	Monarch (and lifespan)	Reign	Consort (and tenure)	Parents, co-regents, and notes
	Diodotus Tryphon ( –138 BC)	142/141–138 BC		Last coins date to 138 BC but his reign might have lasted into early 137 BC.

=== Seleucid dynasty ===
Portrait	Monarch (and lifespan)	Reign	Consort (and tenure)	Parents, co-regents, and notes
	Antiochus VII Sidetes ( –129 BC)	138–129 BC	Cleopatra Thea (138–129 BC)	Son of Demetrius I and possibly Laodice V. Married his brother's wife after Demetrius II was captured by the Parthians.
	Demetrius II Nicator ( –125 BC)	129–125 BC (second reign)	Cleopatra Thea (129–125 BC)	Was released by the Parthians and regained his throne and wife following Antiochus VII's death in a battle against Parthia.
	Antiochus VIII Grypus ( –96 BC)	128 BC (first reign)		Son of Demetrius II and Cleopatra Thea. He was elevated as king by his mother in an attempt to establish her authority.
	Alexander II Zabinas ( –123 BC)	128–123 BC		Claimed to be of Seleucid heritage. (Note: Alexander fabricated a genealogy that presented him as the son of Alexander I Balas according to Poseidonius, or the adopted son of Antiochus VII according to Justin.) Declared himself king in opposition to Demetrius II.

=== Ptolemaic dynasty ===
Portrait	Monarch (and lifespan)	Reign	Consort (and tenure)	Parents, co-regents, and notes
	Cleopatra Thea (c. 165–121 BC)	125–121 BC		Daughter of Ptolemy VI and Cleopatra II of Egypt.; Cleopatra Thea assumed power in her own right; she abandoned her husband Demetrius II and arranged his murder in 125 BC.

=== Seleucid dynasty ===
Portrait	Monarch (and lifespan)	Reign	Consort (and tenure)	Parents, co-regents, and notes
	Seleucus V Philometor ( –125 BC)	125 BC		Son of Demetrius II and Cleopatra Thea.; He declared himself king following his father's murder against the wishes of his mother who killed him.
	Antiochus VIII Grypus ( –96 BC)	125–96 BC (second reign)	Tryphaena (124–111 BC); Cleopatra Selene (103–96 BC)	Due to the discontent arising from her becoming a queen regnant, Cleopatra Thea elevated Antiochus VIII as co-king. (Note: In 124/123 BC, he married Tryphaena who was murdered in 111 BC by Antiochus IX. By 103 BC, he married Tryphaena's sister Cleopatra Selene.)
	Antiochus IX Cyzicenus ( –95 BC)	114–95 BC	Cleopatra IV (114–112 BC); Cleopatra Selene (96–95 BC)	Son of Antiochus VII and Cleopatra Thea.; He rose against Antiochus VIII with the help of Cleopatra IV.
Antiochus VIII died in 96 BC and Antiochus IX followed him in 95 BC; the country became embroiled in a civil war in which Antiochus VIII's five sons and the descendants of Antiochus IX fought between themselves. The chronology of all those monarchs is problematic and is specially vague regarding Seleucus VI's successors.
	Demetrius III Eucaerus ( –88 BC)	96–88 BC		Son of Antiochus VIII and Tryphaena.; Declared king in Damascus.
	Seleucus VI Epiphanes ( –94/93 BC)	96–94/93 BC		Son of Antiochus VIII and Tryphaena. Defeated Antiochus IX but was soon killed.
	Antiochus X Eusebes ( –92)	95–92 BC	Cleopatra Selene (95–92 BC)	Son of Antiochus IX and a first wife whose name is lost.; Avenged his father and killed Seleucus VI. (Note: His reign might have actually ended in 89/88 BC.) He married his step-mother.
	Antiochus XI Epiphanes ( –93 BC)	94–93 BC		Son of Antiochus VIII and Tryphaena. Killed by Antiochus X.
	Philip I Philadelphus ( –83 BC)	94–84/83 BC		Son of Antiochus VIII and Tryphaena. Took the throne with his twin Antiochus XI. (Note: Philip's death date is unknown but traditionally assumed to be the year 84 or 83 BC. Although there is a possibility that he ruled until 75 BC.)
	Antiochus XII Dionysus ( –84 BC)	87–84/83 BC		Son of Antiochus VIII and Tryphaena. Ruled only in Damascus.

=== Ptolemaic dynasty ===
Portrait	Monarch (and lifespan)	Reign	Consort (and tenure)	Parents, co-regents, and notes
	Cleopatra Selene (c. 135/130–69 BC)	83–69 BC		Daughter of Ptolemy VIII and his wife Cleopatra III of Egypt.; Cleopatra Selene declared her son Antiochus XIII king following the deaths of both Antiochus XII and Philip I; she seems to have installed herself co-ruler.

=== Seleucid dynasty ===
Portrait	Monarch (and lifespan)	Reign	Consort (and tenure)	Parents, co-regents, and notes
	Antiochus XIII Asiaticus (c. 94–63 BC)	83 or 83–74 BC (first reign)		Son of Antiochus X and Cleopatra Selene.; Might have had a brother, Seleucus VII Philometer, as a co-ruler. (Note: In 2002, numismatist Brian Kritt announced the discovery and decipherment of a coin bearing the portrait of Cleopatra Selene and a co-ruler; Kritt read the name of the ruler as Seleucus Philometor and, based on the epithet "Philometor", meaning mother loving, identified him with Cleopatra Selene's son, unnamed by Cicero. Kritt gave the newly discovered ruler the regnal name Seleucus VII, and considered it very likely that he is identical with Kybiosaktes. The reading of "Seleucus VII" was accepted by some scholars such as Lloyd Llewellyn-Jones and Michael Roy Burgess, but Oliver D Hoover rejected Kritt's reading, noting that the coin was badly damaged and some letters were unreadable; Hoover read the king's name as Antiochus and identified him with Antiochus XIII.)

=== Artaxiad dynasty ===
Portrait	Monarch (and lifespan)	Reign	Consort (and tenure)	Parents, co-regents, and notes
	Tigranes the Great (140–55 BC)	83/74–69 BC		King of Armenia, invaded Syria; the year of the invasion is up to debate and is traditionally given as 83 BC based on the account of Appian. The date of the invasion might actually be later, around 74 BC. The Armenian king captured Cleopatra Selene and killed her in 69 BC, but he was forced by the Romans to evacuate Syria the same year.

=== Seleucid dynasty ===
Portrait	Monarch (and lifespan)	Reign	Consort (and tenure)	Parents, co-regents, and notes
	Antiochus XIII Asiaticus (c. 94–63 BC)	69–67 BC (second reign)		The Roman general Pompey confirmed Antiochus as king following Tigranes departure.
	Philip II Philoromaeus ( –after 57 BC)	67–65 BC		Son of Philip I. Elevated by the people of Antioch following Antiochus XIII's capture by Sampsiceramus I of Emesa.
	Antiochus XIII Asiaticus (c. 94–63 BC)	65–64 BC (third reign)		Freed by his captor, he ruled for one year before being deposed by Pompey who annexed Syria as a Roman province.

=== Antonian dynasty ===
Portrait	Monarch (and lifespan)	Reign	Consort (and tenure)	Parents, co-regents, and notes
	Ptolemy Philadelphus (36–after 30 BC)	34–30 BC		Son of Mark Antony and Cleopatra VII of Egypt. He was declared king of Syria during the Donations of Alexandria.

=== Hashemite dynasty ===
On 8 March 1920, prince Faysal of the House of Hashim, supported by the Syrian National Congress, declared himself king of the Arab Kingdom of Syria; the kingdom collapsed on 24 July of the same year.

Portrait	Name (and lifespan)	Reign	Consort (and tenure)	Standard	Notes
	Faisal (20 May 1885 – 8 September 1933)	8 March 1920 – 24 July 1920	Huzaima bint Nasser (8 March 1920 – 24 July 1920)		Son of Hussein bin Ali and Abdiyah bint Abdullah of Mecca.

== Biblical usage for Aramean kings ==
In the first translation of the Old Testament into Greek written during the third century BC (called the Septuagint), Aram and Arameans were often translated as Syria and the Syrians; hence, the king was referred to as the king of Syria, and this was carried on by many English translations. Aram in the Hebrew Old Testament and Syria in the translation indicated the kingdom of Aram-Damascus most of the times. Occasionally, other Aramean regions were also referred to as Syria. In the view of W. Edward Glenny, the rendering of Aram by Syria might be explained by an anti-Syrian bias, since at the time of the translation, Syria belonged to the Seleucids, the Jews' main enemy; Aram-Damascus was the Jews' enemy during its Iron Age prime in the 9th century BC.

=== Aramean kings referred to as "kings of Syria" ===
Portrait	Name	Reign	Notes
	Rezon	10th century BC	Mentioned as "ruling over Syria" in 1 Kings 11:25.; Also named "Ezron", and known only from the Old Testament.
	Hezion	10th century BC	The name "Hazib" was also used for him. Known only from the Old Testament.
	Ben-Hadad I		Known only from the Old Testament.
	Ben-Hadad II		Equated by many Biblical scholars with Adad-Idri who was mentioned in Assyrian sources.
	Hazael	c. 842–800 BC	Probably a usurper; described in Assyrian records as "the son of a nobody".
	Ben-Hadad III		The only king mentioned by the name "Ben-Hadad" both in the Old Testament and extra-biblical sources.
	Rezin	750s–733 BC	Known in Assyrian inscription as Raqyan.

== See also ==
- List of Seleucid rulers
- List of Assyrian kings
- List of Palmyrene monarchs
- History of Syria
- the region of Syria
- Syrian nationalism
