= List of Aramean kings =

Aramean kings were kings of the ancient Arameans, and rulers of various Aramean states that existed throughout the Levant and Mesopotamia during the 14th and 13th centuries BC, before being absorbed by various other empires such as the Neo-Assyrian Empire, Neo-Babylonian Empire and the Achaemenid Empire.

== Kings ==
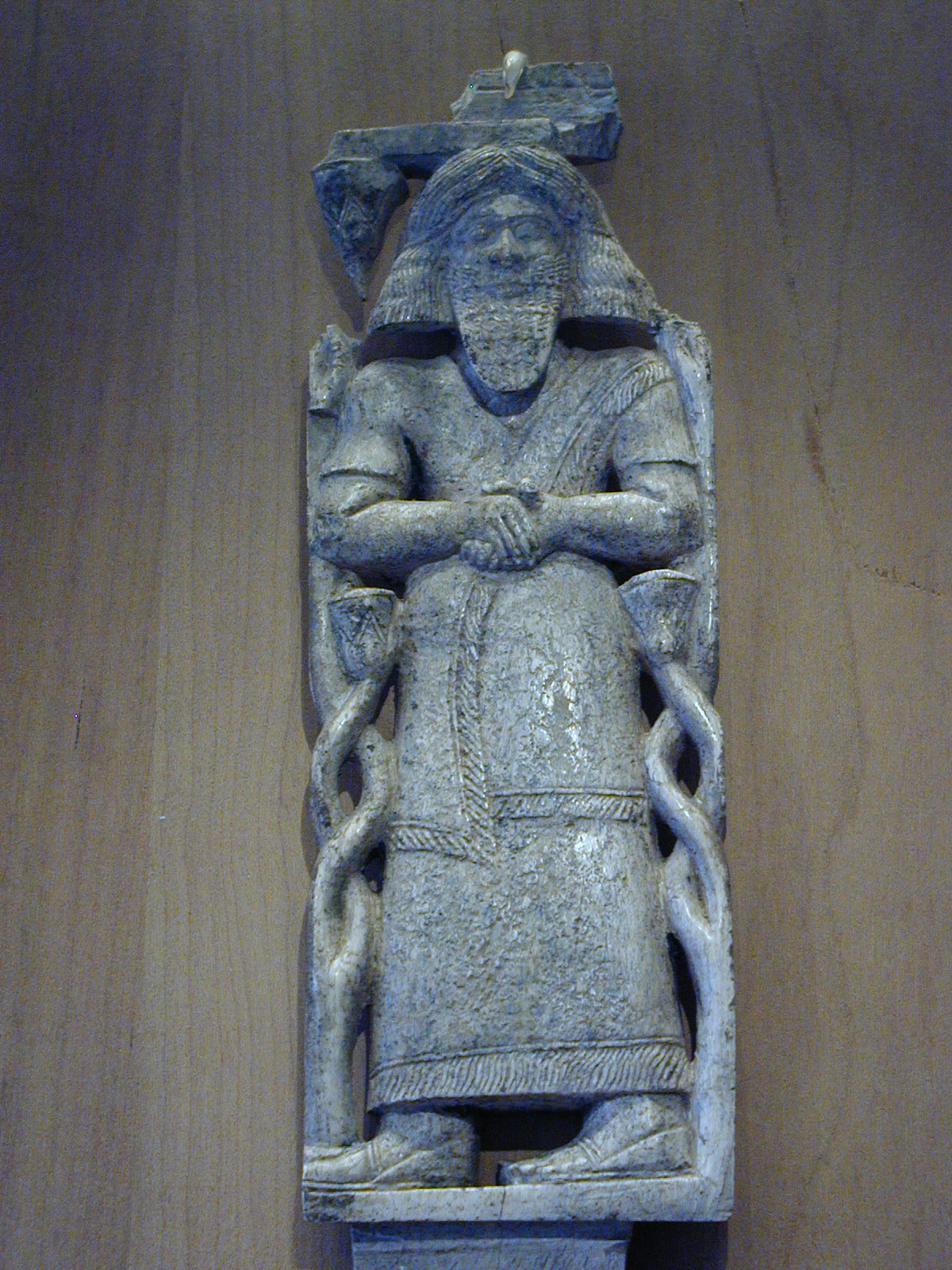
King Hazael of Aram-Damascus

Aramean kings are known from various inscriptions, and some are also mentioned in the Hebrew Bible.

=== Aram-Damascus ===
Name	Reign	Notes
Hezion	ca. mid-10th century B.C.E.	According to the genealogy in 1 Kings 15:18, Hezion was a king of Aram-Damascus. Ben-Hadad I is described as “the son of Tabrimmon, the son of Hezion, king of Aram, who lived in Damascus.”
Tabrimmon	ca. late 10th century B.C.E.	
Ben-Hadad I	ca. early 9th century B.C.E.	
Hadadezer (Ben-Hadad II)	ca. 865-844 B.C.E.	
Hazael	ca. 844-805 B.C.E.	
Ben-Hadad III	ca. 805-780 B.C.E.	
Hadianu	ca. 780-754 B.C.E.	
Rezin	ca. 754–732 B.C.E.	

=== Bit-Agusi ===
Name	Reign	Notes
Gusi	ca. 870	Dynasty founder
Hadram	ca. 860–830	son of Gusi (Arame)
Attar-šumki I	ca. 830–800 / 805–796	son of Hadram, synonym Bar-Guš
Bar-Hadad	ca. 800	son of Attar-šumki I, reign unclear
Attar-šumki II	1st half 8th century	son of Bar-Hadad
Mati-Ilu	mid 8th century	son of Attar-šumki II

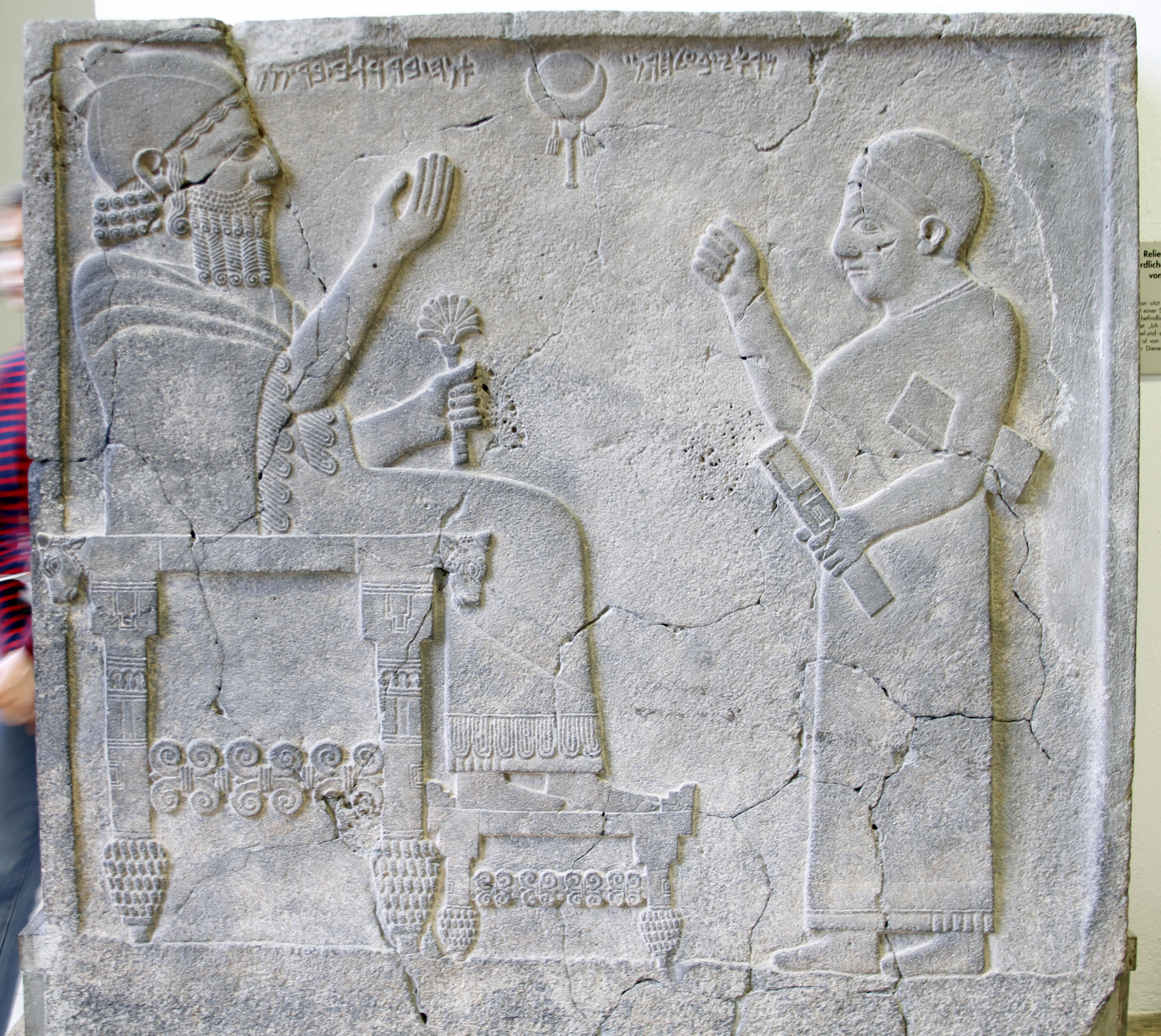
King Bar Rakib on his throne, before him stands a scribe Bit Gabbari

=== Bit-Gabbari (Sam'al) ===
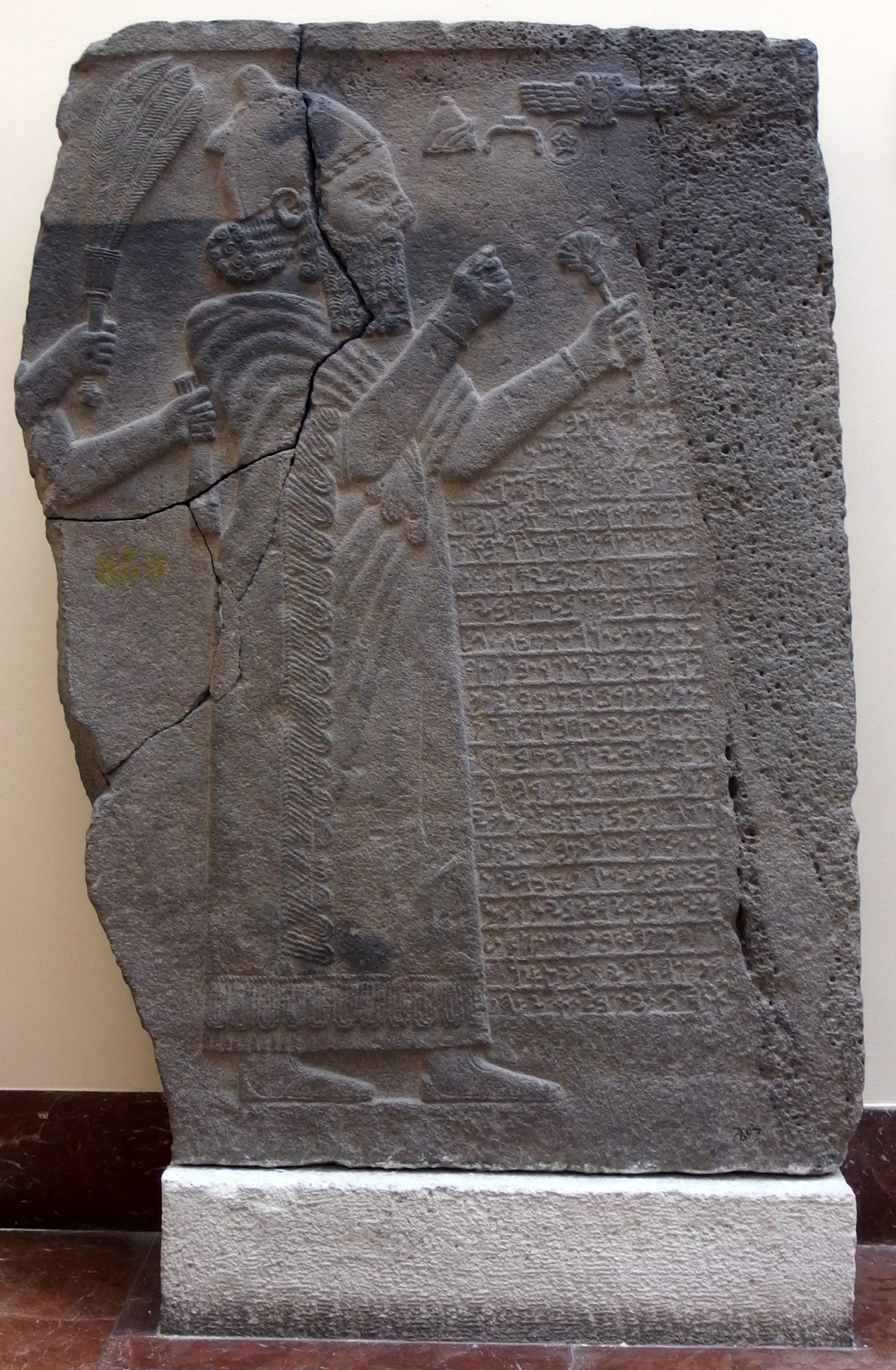
A stele of the Aramean king Bar-Rakib

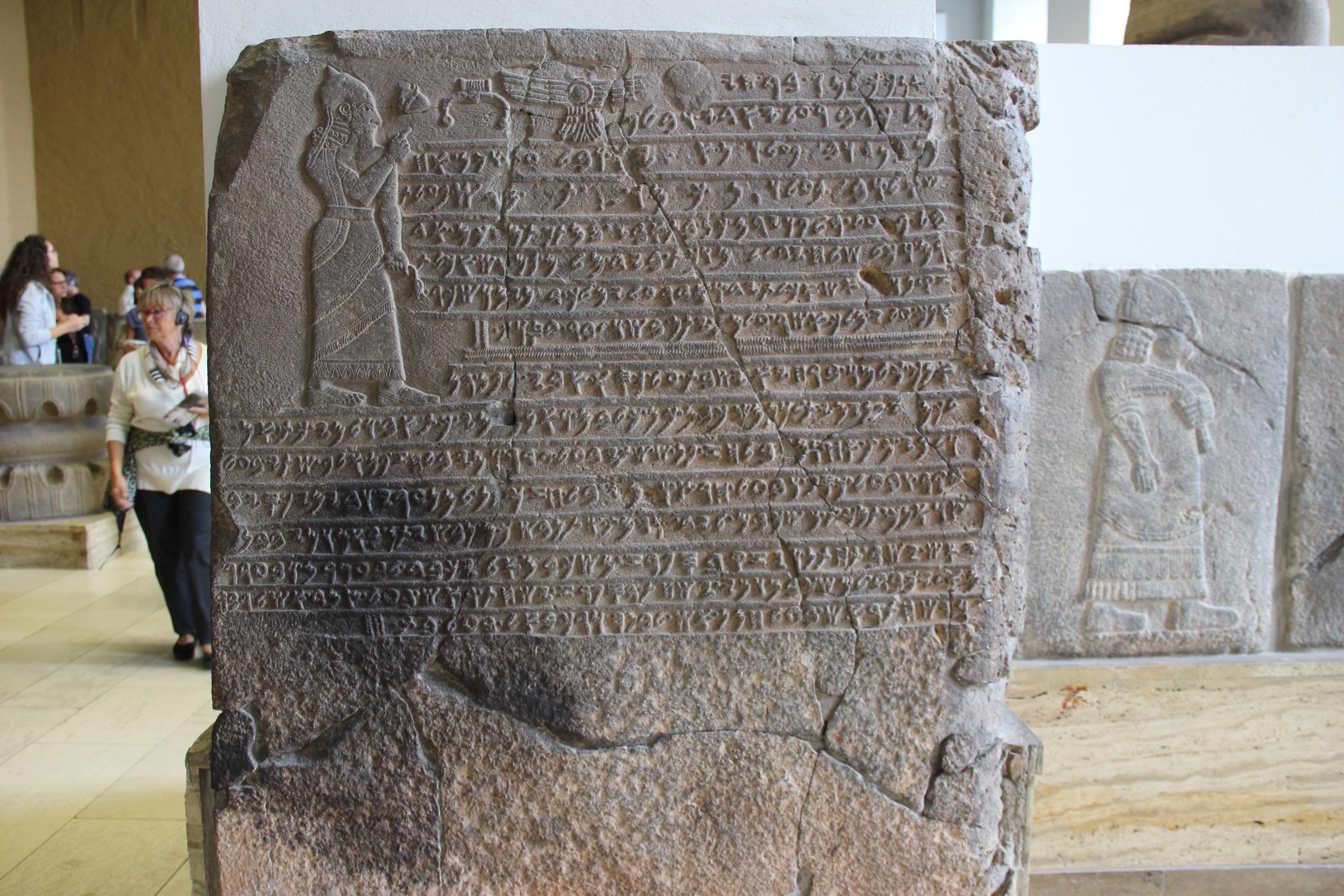
King Kilamuwa standing in front of deities symbols

Name	Reign	Notes
Gabbar	ca 920/ca. 900 – 880	Dynasty founder
Bamah	ca. 880–865	son of Gabbar
Hayya	ca. 865–840	son of Bamah
Ša-il	ca. 840–830	son of Hayya
Kilamuwa	ca. 830–820	brother of Ša-il
Qarli	ca. 820–790	son of Ahabbu?, he unified Sam'al and Y'DY
Panamuwa I	ca. 790–750	son of Qarli, synonym Panammu
Bar-Sur	ca. 750	son of Panamuwa I
Panamuwa II	ca. 743–727	son of Bar-Sur, synonym Panammu
Bar-Rakib	727–713/711	son of Panamuwa II

=== Kasku ===
Name	Reign	Notes
Bar-Ga'ya	mid 8th century	Possibly an independent Assyrian high official, not under Assyrian overlord.

=== Aram-Zobah ===
Name	Reign	Notes
Hadadezer	at the time of Saul and David of Israel	

=== Bit Bahiani ===
Name	Reign	Notes
Bahianu	-	Dynasty founder
Abisalmu	-	-
Kapara	950–875 BC	He built a monumental palace in Neo-Hittite style discovered by Max von Oppenheim in 1911, with a rich decoration of statues and relief orthostats

=== Hamath ===
Name	Reign	Notes
T'oi	-	-
Hadoram	-	-
Paratas	-	-
Irhuleni	853 BC	He led a coalition against the Assyrian expansion under Shalmaneser III, alongside Hadadezer of Damascus.
Uratamis	-	-
Zakkur	-	-
Eni-Ilu	-	-
Yaub'di	-	-

=== Aram-Naharaim ===
Name	Reign	Notes
Cushan-rishathaim	1250 BC	He was king of Aram-Naharaim, or Northwest Mesopotamia, and the first oppressor of the Israelites after their settlement in Canaan.

=== Bit-Zamani ===
Name	Reign	Notes
Ammi-Ba'al	900–879 BC	He was king of Bit-Zamani, or Northwest Mesopotamia known for his rivals against Tukulti-Ninurta II.
Bur-Ramman	879–866	Successor of Ammi-Ba'al
Ilan	879–866 BC	Successor and brother of Bur-Ramman

=== Bit-Adini ===
Name	Reign	Notes
Adin(i)	883–876 BC	He was the first king of Bit-Adini
Akhuni Bar-Adin	876–858 BC	Successor and descent of Adin and defeated by Ashurnasirpal II

=== Palmyrene Empire ===
The Palmyrene rulers may have had both Arab and Aramean ancestry.

Name	Reign	Notes
Odaenathus	260–267	Founder of the Palmyrene monarchy, dropped the King title and started using King of Kings by 263
Hairan I	263–267	Made co-King of Kings by his father.
Maeonius	267–267	No evidence exist for his reign, but he allegedly murdered Odaenathus and his son, Hairan and attempted a usurpation
Vaballathus	267–272	Dropped the "King of Kings" title in 270, replacing it with the Latin rex (king) and declared emperor in 271. Reigned under the regency of his mother, Zenobia.
Zenobia	267–272	Ruled as a regent for her children and did not claim to rule in her own right.
Septimius Antiochus	273–273	Possibly a son of Zenobia.

== See also ==
- Aram (region)
- Aramean states
- Bit-Halupe
- Gambulu
- Luhuti
- Maacah
- Osroene
- Paddan Aram
- Syria (region)
- History of Syria
- List of Syrian monarchs

== Sources ==
- Gzella, Holger (2015). A Cultural History of Aramaic: From the Beginnings to the Advent of Islam. Leiden-Boston: Brill. ISBN 9789004285101.
- Lipiński, Edward (2000). The Aramaeans: Their Ancient History, Culture, Religion. Leuven: Peeters Publishers. ISBN 9789042908598.
- Sader, Hélène (2014). "History". The Aramaeans in Ancient Syria. Leiden: Brill. pp. 11–36. ISBN 9789004229433.
- Younger, Kenneth Lawson (2016). A Political History of the Arameans: From Their Origins to the End of Their Polities. Atlanta: SBL Press. ISBN 9781628370843.
