= Ben-hadad =

Benhadad, Ben Hadad, Ben-hadad (in the Jewish Publication Society of America Version) or Benadad (in the Douay–Rheims Bible) (Hebrew: בֶּן-הֲדַד, Son of Hadad; Latin: Benadad), may refer to:

- Any king of Aram-Damascus. Hadad was the name of the senior Aramean deity.
- Particular kings of Aram-Damascus:
  - Ben-Hadad I, king of Aram Damascus between 885 BCE and 865 BCE
  - Hadadezer (Ben-Hadad II), king of Aram Damascus at the time of the battle of Qarqar against the Assyrian king Shalmaneser III in 853 BCE. Also known as Adad-Idri (Assyr.) and possibly the same as Bar-Hadad II (Aram.); Ben-Hadad II (Heb.).
  - Ben-Hadad III, king of Aram Damascus and son and successor of Hazael. His succession is mentioned in II Kings 13:3, 24. He is thought to have ruled from 796 BCE to 792 BCE, although there are many conflicting opinions among Biblical archaeologists as to the length of his reign.

== See also ==
- Benjamin Haddad (b. 1985), French politician
