= Melqart stele =

Ancient stele

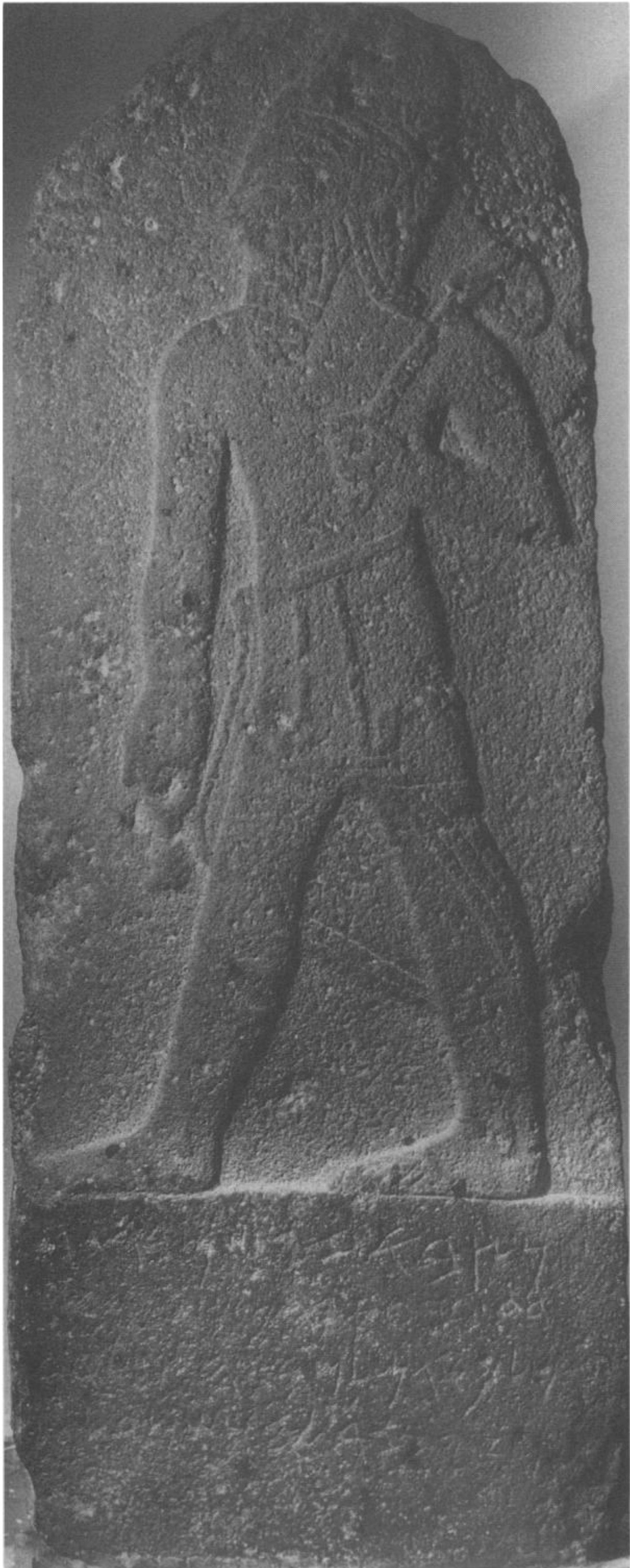
- The stele
- Writing: Aramaic inscription
- Created: 9th century BCE
- Period/culture: Aramaean
- Discovered: 1939
- Place: Burayj, 7km north of Aleppo, Syria
- Present location: National Museum of Aleppo
- Identification: AO 8185

The Melqart stele, also known as the Ben-Hadad or Bir-Hadad stele, is an Aramaic stele which was created during the 9th century BCE and was discovered in 1939 in Roman ruins in Bureij Syria (7 km north of Aleppo). The Old Aramaic inscription is known as KAI 201; its five lines reads:

“The stele which Bar-Had-

-ad, son of [...]

king of Aram, erected to his Lord Melqar-

-t, to whom he made a vow and who heard his voi-

-ce.”

According to William Foxwell Albright, the stele should be attributed to Ben-Hadad I, an Aramean king mentioned in the First Book of Kings. However, Kenneth Kitchen disagrees and states that there is no actual evidence that connects the Melqart stele to Ben-Hadad I. a recent re-analysis of the stele indicated that the Ben-Hadad referred to is actually the king of Arpad.

Hackett and Wilson-Wright reconstitute the first two lines of the inscription as,

"1. The statue which Bir-Ha-
2. dad, son of ʕAttar-sumkī, Bir-Gūš,"

According to them,

"Attar-sumkī was a king from the line of Gūš, the founder of a dynasty originally from the tribe of Yaḫan in the early ninth century BCE."

== See also ==
- Canaanite and Aramaic inscriptions
- List of Neo-Hittite kings
- List of artifacts significant to the Bible
- Melqart

== Bibliography ==
- Maurice Dunand, Stèle araméenne dédiée à Melqart, Bulletin du Musée de Beyrouth III (1939), p. 65–76
- Dunand, Maurice (1942). "A propos de la stèle de Melqart du musée d'Alep". Bulletin du Musée de Beyrouth. 6: 41–45. OCLC 1136089902.
- Albright, W. F. (1942). "A Votive Stele Erected by Ben-Hadad I of Damascus to the God Melcarth". Bulletin of the American Schools of Oriental Research (87): 23–29. doi:10.2307/1355460. JSTOR 1355460. S2CID 163203878.
- Della Vida, G. Levi; Albright, W. F. (1943). "Some Notes on the Stele of Ben-Hadad". Bulletin of the American Schools of Oriental Research (90): 30–34. doi:10.2307/1354906. JSTOR 1354906. S2CID 163726442.
- Jepsen, Alfred (1952). "Zur Melqart-Stele Barhadads". Archiv für Orientforschung. 16: 315–317. JSTOR 41635800.
- Cross, Frank Moore (1972). "The Stele Dedicated to Melcarth by Ben-Hadad of Damascus". Bulletin of the American Schools of Oriental Research (205): 36–42. doi:10.2307/1356214. JSTOR 1356214. S2CID 163497507.
- Black, Matthew. "The Milqart Stele." In Documents from Old Testament Times. Edited by D. W. Thomas, 239-41. London: Thomas Nelson, 1958. Reprinted, Ancient Texts and Translations. Eugene, OR: Wipf & Stock, 2005.
- Dearman, J. Andrew; Miller, J. Maxwell (July 1983). "The Melqart Stele and the Ben Hadads of Damascus: Two Studies". Palestine Exploration Quarterly. 115 (2): 95–101. doi:10.1179/peq.1983.115.2.95.
- Reinhold, Gotthard (1 January 1986). "The Bir-Hadad Stele and the Biblical Kings of Aram". Andrews University Seminary Studies. 24 (2).
