= Hamath-zobah =

Hamath-zobah was a place of uncertain location in Aram or Ancient Israel. According to 2 Chronicles 8:3, it was conquered by Solomon and thus figured in his only military engagement alluded to in the Books of Chronicles. It is not referred to in the parallel or source passage in 1 Kings 9.

Hamath and Zobah were likely adjoining kingdoms, whence the compound name "Hamath-Zobah", an idea supported by mention of wars between Hadadezer of Zobah and Toi of Hamath in 2 Samuel 8:9-10. According to Martin J. Selman, the existence of a joint name "Hamath-Zobah" indicated that by the time of Solomon the two kingdoms had joined into a single polity.

== See also ==
- History of ancient Israel and Judah
- Homs
