= Arslan Tash ivory inscription =

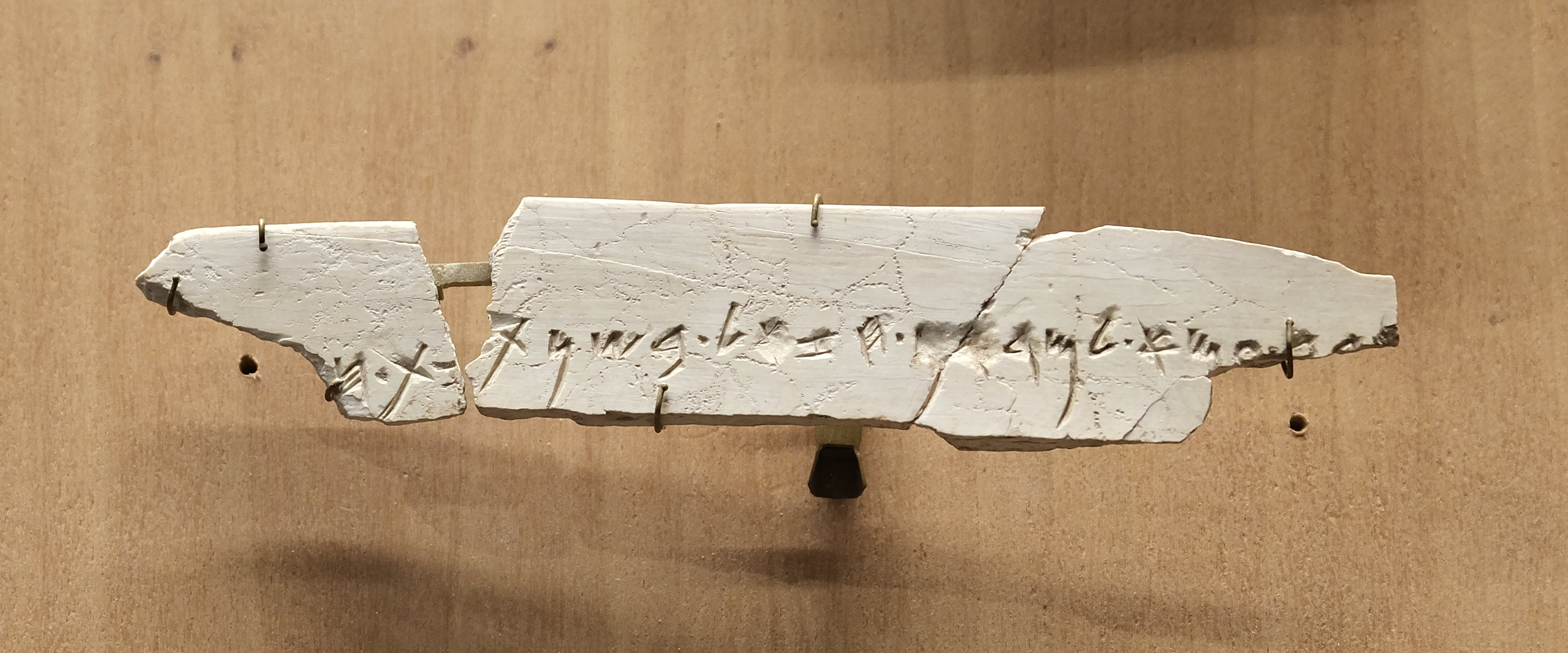
- The inscription in the Louvre (AO 11489)
- Material: Ivory
- Writing: Aramaic
- Discovered: 1928; Arslan Tash, northern Syria
- Discovered by: François Thureau-Dangin
- Present location: Louvre Museum, Paris, France

Arslan Tash ivory inscription is a small ivory plaque with an Aramaic language inscription found in 1928 in Arslan Tash in northern Syria (ancient Hadātu) by a team of French archaeologists led by François Thureau-Dangin.

It has been dated to the late 9th century BCE, on the basis of the name "Hazael" in the inscription, who has been speculated to be the Biblical Hazael of Aram-Damascus. The inscription is known as KAI 232.

The plaque, along with many other ivory items, was found on the site of a palace from the 8th century BC belonging to the city's Neo-Assyrian governor.

Three parts of the plaque have been found; two parts fit together, the third one does not. The two joined parts together are 2 cm high and 7.9 cm long, while the third part is 1.9 cm high and 3.2 cm long. The entire inscription on the plate is usually reconstructed as follows:

This ... son of Amma, engraved for our lord Hazael in the year ...

Currently, the plaque is in the Louvre collection under the inventory number AO 11489.

== Bibliography ==
- Clyde E. Fant, Mitchell G. Reddish, "Lost Treasures of the Bible", Wm. B. Eerdmans Publishing Co., Grand Rapids / Cambridge 2008, pp. 106–109.
