= Aram (region) =

Historical region in the Levant mentioned in the Bible

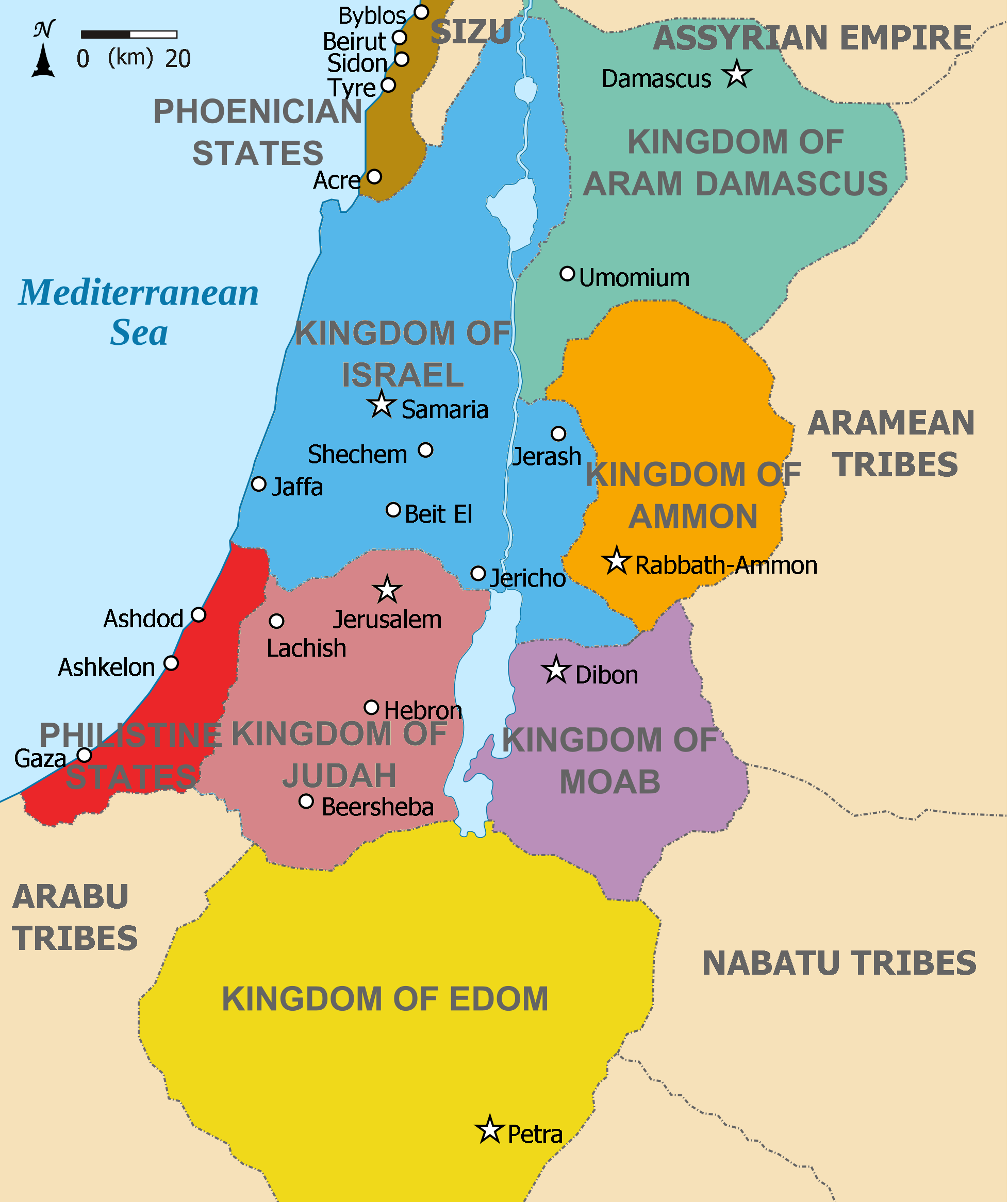
The Levant c. 830 BCE

Aram (Imperial Aramaic: 𐡀𐡓𐡌, romanized: ʾĀrām; Hebrew: אֲרָם, romanized: ʾĂrām; Syriac: ܐܪܡ) was a historical region mentioned in early cuneiforms and in the Bible. The area did not develop into a larger empire but consisted of several small states in present-day Syria. Some of the states are mentioned in the Hebrew Bible, Aram-Damascus being the most outstanding one, which came to encompass most of Syria. In the Bible, Aram-Damascus is simply commonly referred to as Aram.

After the final conquest by the rising Neo-Assyrian Empire in the second half of the 8th century BCE and also during the later consecutive rules of the Neo-Babylonian Empire (612–539 BCE) and the Achaemenid Empire (539–332 BCE), the region of Aram lost most of its sovereignty. During the Seleucid period (312-64 BCE), the term Syria was introduced as Hellenistic designation for this region. By the beginning of the 5th century, that practice also started to affect terminology of Aramean ecclesiastical and literary elites, and Syrian labels started to gain frequency and acceptance not only in Aramean translations of Greek works, but also in original works of Aramean writers.

Aramaic eventually replaced Akkadian as the lingua franca of the entire region and became the administrative and commercial language of several empires such as the Achaemenid Empire and the Neo-Babylonian Empire. Early on, the Christian Bible was translated into Aramaic, and by the 4th century the local Aramaic dialect of Edessa (Urhay) developed into a literary language, known as Edessan Aramaic (Urhaya) or more commonly as Syriac.

== Etymology ==
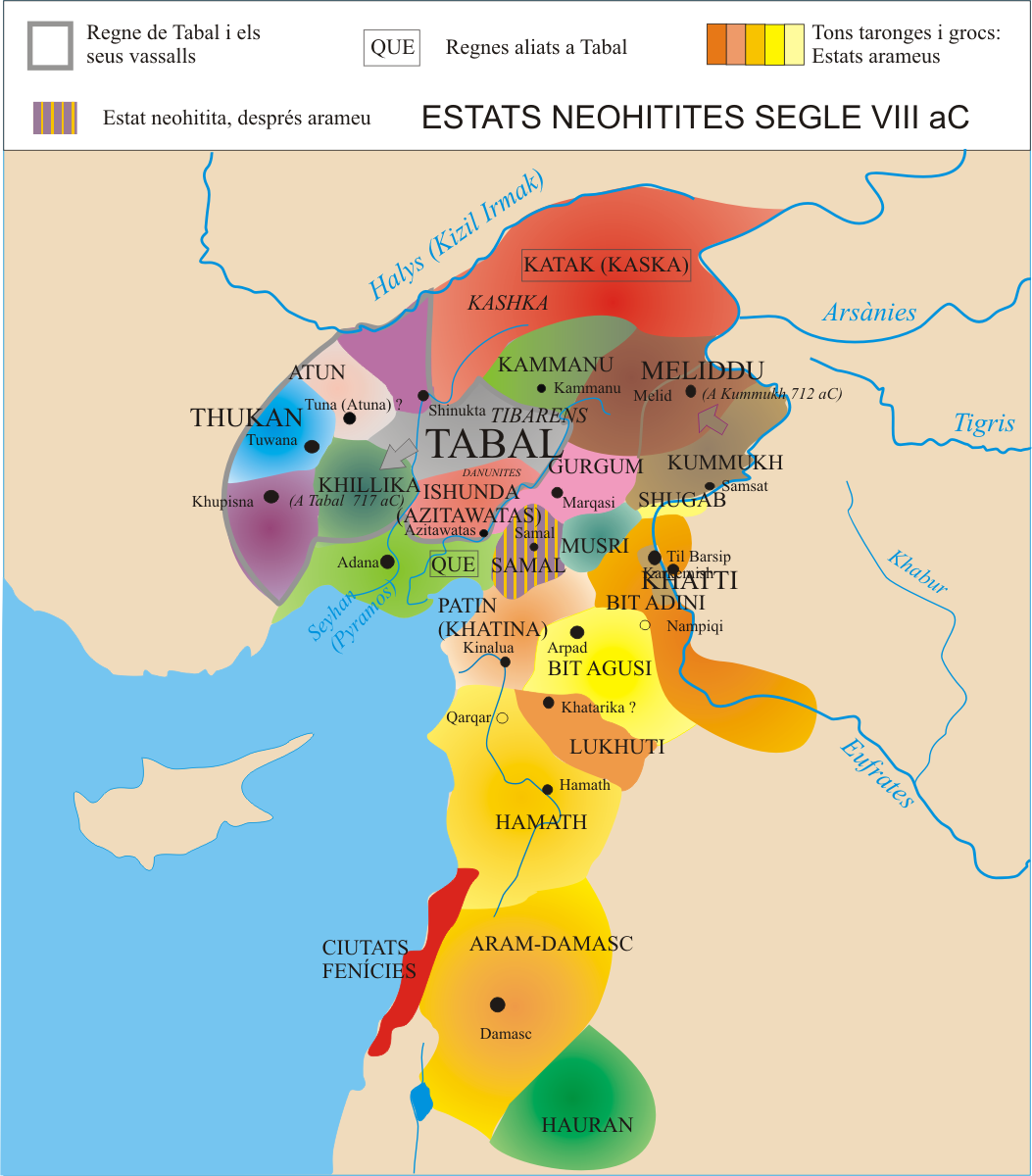
Various Neo-Hittite and western Aramean (orange shades) states in the 8th century BC

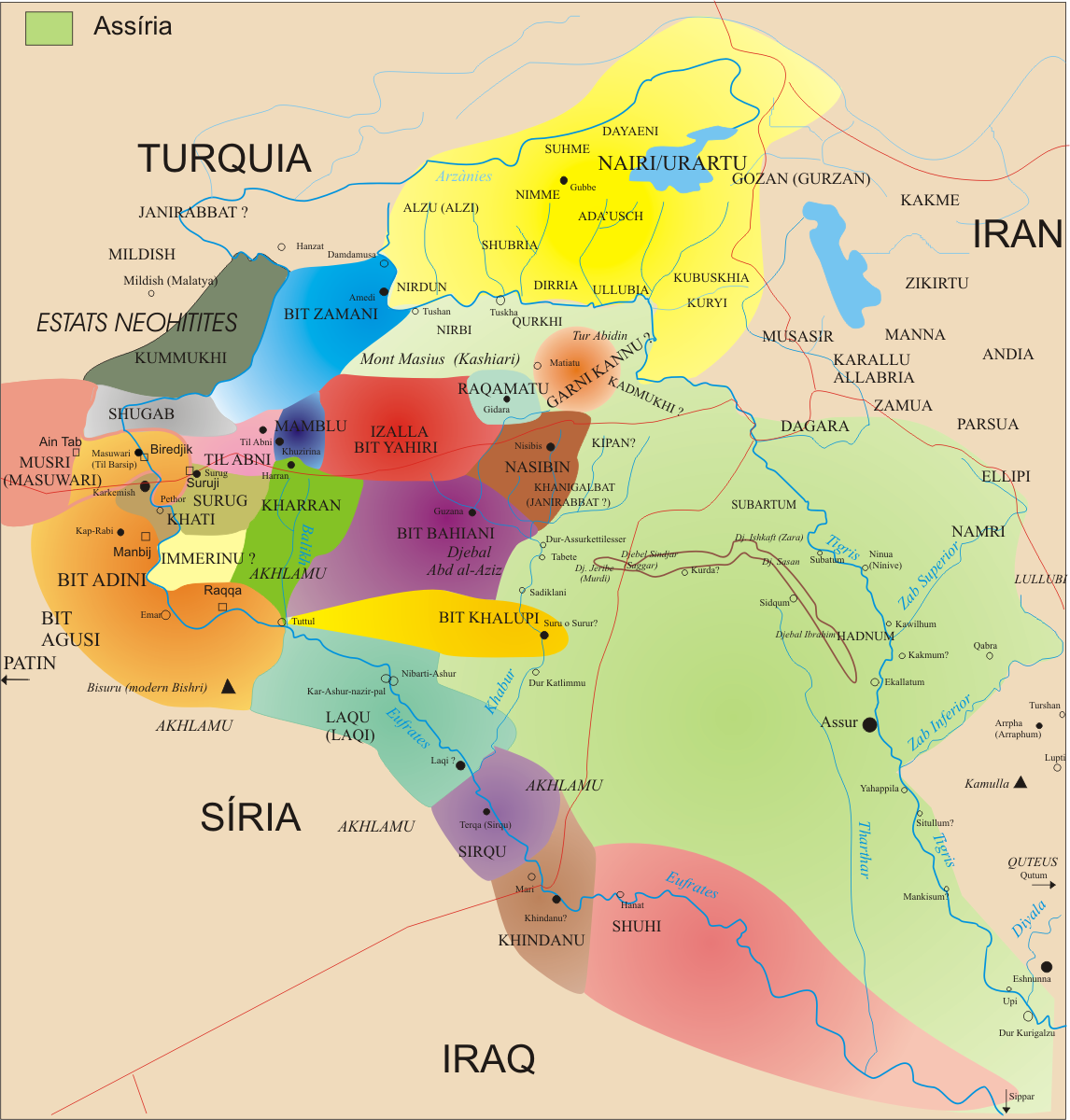
Assyria (green), Urartu (yellow) and eastern Aramean states (various other shades) in the 9th century BC

The choronym of the name Aram refers to the geographical region in which they lived and means High(landers). The toponym A-ra-mu appears in an inscription at the East Semitic speaking kingdom of Ebla listing geographical names, and the term Armi, which is the Eblaite term for nearby Idlib, occurs frequently in the Ebla tablets (c. 2300 BCE). One of the annals of Naram-Sin of Akkad (c. 2250 BCE) mentions that he captured "Dubul, the ensí of A-ra-me" (Arame is seemingly a genitive form), in the course of a campaign against Simurrum in the northern mountains. Other early references to a place or people of "Aram" have appeared at the archives of Mari (c. 1900 BCE) and at Ugarit (c. 1300 BCE). The terms Aram and Aramean frequently occur in the letters of a governor's archive from Nippur. The written text informed about farmers from Bīt-Aram referring to the region of Aram.

The word Aḫlamū was attested since the Old Babylonian period, first as a designation for the Amorites and later for the Arameans. In the Assyrian royal inscriptions the term Aḫlamū and the name A-ra-mu are sometimes combined to form a double designation for Arameans.

Early Jewish tradition claims that the name is derived from the biblical Aram, son of Shem, a grandson of Noah in the Bible.

== History ==
The Arameans appear to have displaced the earlier Semitic Amorite (Aḫlamū) populations of ancient Syria during the period from 1100 BC to 900 BC, which was a Dark Age for the entire West Asia, North Africa, Caucasus, Mediterranean regions, with great upheavals and mass movements of people. The early history of the Arameans is tied to that of the Aḫlamū and Sutû who were already known in the Late Bronze Age and who seem to have played a role in the period's demise. The Arameans rose to be the prominent group amongst the Ahlamu, and from c. 1200 BC on, the Amorites disappeared from the pages of history and the term Ahlamu underwent a semantic shift, becoming an accepted term for Aramean. From then on, the region that they had inhabited became known as Aram and Eber-Nari.

The Arameans emerged in a region which was largely under the domination of the Middle Assyrian Empire (1365–1050 BC) and quickly posed a threat to the Assyrian polity which was largely located west of the Euphrates. In order to nullify this threat, Tiglath-Pileser I (1115–1077 BC) of Assyria performed many campaigns in Aramean territory, although the numerous campaigns that the Assyrian records recorded that he took indicate that Assyrian military campaigns were unsuccessful at exercising power or dominance over the Arameans. Some scholars believe that the Arameans took Nineveh in this time. In the 11th century BC, Assyria fell into decline, which may have been caused by the incursions of the emerging Arameans, allowing the Arameans to establish a string of states across the Levant and make notable expansions into Assyrian territory, such as in the Khabur Valley. During the period 1050 – 900 BC, Arameans came to dominate most of what is now Syria, but was then called Eber-Nari and Aramea.

Two medium-sized Aramaean kingdoms, Aram-Damascus and Hamath, along with several smaller kingdoms and independent city-states, developed in the region during the early first millennium BCE. The most notable of these were Bit Adini, Bit Bahiani, Bit Hadipe, Aram-Rehob, Aram-Zobah, Bit-Zamani, Bit-Halupe and Aram-Ma'akah, as well as the Aramean tribal polities of the Gambulu, Litau and Puqudu.

There was some synthesis with neo Hittite populations in northern Syria and south central Anatolia, and a number of small so called Syro-Hittite states arose in the region, such as Tabal. The east Mediterranean coast was largely dominated by Phoenician city states such as Tyre, Sidon, Berytus and Arvad.

With the advent of the Neo Assyrian Empire, the region was invaded on several occasions, since the middle of the 9th century, and finally fell under the control of Assyrian kings during the second half of the 8th century BCE. Large numbers of people living in the region were deported into Assyria, Babylonia and elsewhere. A few steles that name kings of this period have been found, such as the 8th-century Zakkur stele. The Assyrians and Babylonians themselves adopted a Mesopotamian form of Aramaic, known as Imperial Aramaic in the 8th century BC, when Tiglath-pileser III made it the lingua franca of his vast empire. The Neo Aramaic dialects still spoken by the indigenous Assyrians and Mandeans of northern Iraq, south east Turkey, north east Syria and north west Iran, descend from this language.

The Neo Assyrian Empire was riven by unremitting civil war from 626 BC onward, weakening it severely, and allowing it to be attacked and destroyed by a coalition of its former vassals between 616 and 605 BCE. The region of Aram was subsequently fought over by the Neo-Babylonian Empire and Egyptians, the latter of whom had belatedly come to the aid of their former Assyrian overlords. The Babylonians prevailed and Aram became a part of the Neo-Babylonian Empire (612–539 BC) where it remained named Eber-Nari.

The Persian Achaemenid Empire (539–332 BC) overthrew the Babylonians and conquered the region. They retained the Imperial Aramaic introduced by the Assyrians, and the name of Eber-Nari.

In 332 BC the region was conquered by the Greek ruler, Alexander the Great. Upon his death in 323 BC this area became part of the Greek Seleucid Empire, at which point Greek replaced the Assyrian introduced Imperial Aramaic as the official language of Empire, as were the names Eber-Nari and Aramea. This area and other parts of the former Assyrian Empire to the east (including Assyria itself) were renamed Syria (Seleucid Syria), a 9th-century BC Hurrian, Luwian and Greek corruption of Assyria (see Etymology of Syria and Name of Syria), which had for centuries until this point referred specifically to the land of Assyria and the Assyrians, which in modern terms actually covered the northern half of Iraq, north east Syria, south east Turkey and the north western fringes of Iran, and not the bulk of modern Syria and Lebanon and its largely Aramean and Phoenician inhabitants.

It is from this period that the later Syria vs Assyria naming controversy arises, the Seleucids confusingly applied the name not only to the Mesopotamian land of Assyria itself, but also to the lands west of Euphrates which had never been part of Assyria itself, but merely Aramean, Phoenician, Neo-Hittite and Sutean inhabited colonies. When they lost control of Assyria itself to the Parthians, the name Syria survived but was dislocated from its original source, and was applied only to the land west of Euphrates that had once been part of the Assyrian empire, while Assyria-proper went back to being called Assyria (and also Athura/Assuristan). However, this situation led to both Assyrians and Arameans being dubbed Syrians and later Syriacs in Greco-Roman culture.

This area, by now called Syria, was fought over by Seleucids and Parthians during the 2nd century BCE, and later still by the Romans and Sassanid Persians. Palmyra, a powerful Aramean kingdom arose during this period, and for a time it dominated the area and successfully resisted Roman and Persian attempts at conquest. The region eventually came under the control of the Byzantine Empire. Christianity began to take hold from the 1st to 3rd centuries AD, and the Aramaic language gradually supplanted Canaanite in Phoenecia and Hebrew in Palestine.

In the mid-7th century AD the region fell to the Arab Islamic conquest. Aramaic survived among a sizable portion of the population of Syria, who resisted Arabization. However, the native Western Aramaic of the Aramean Christian population of Syria is spoken today by only a few thousand people, the majority having now adopted the Arabic language. Mesopotamian Eastern Aramaic, which still contains a number of loanwords from the Akkadian, as well as structural similarities, still survives among the majority of ethnically distinct Assyrians, who are mainly based in northern Iraq, north-eastern Syria, south-eastern Turkey and north-western Iran.

== Culture ==
After the fall of the last Aramean kingdoms and city-states the Arameans isolated themselves mainly in Northern Mesopotamia and continued to maintain their culture and identity under Muslim rule till this day. Over one hundred dialects of Aramaic were spoken in the Middle East in the first half of the twentieth century by Arameans and smaller groups of Jews, Mandeans and Muslims.

=== Religion ===
==== Ancient Aramean religion ====
Records of the religion and worship habits among ancient Arameans are fairly scarce. The Aramean pagan pantheon mainly consisted of common Semitic gods who were also worshipped by other Ancient Semitic-speaking peoples who were kin to the Arameans. Their greatest god was Hadad, the god of thunderstorms and fertility. He was also known as Ramman, meaning “thunderer.” Another widespread name for this deity in Aramaic was Rahmana (“merciful”). In the inscriptions left by Aramean kings, this god is often referred to as their protector. Hadad was usually depicted as a bearded soldier striking with thunder or holding a double-edged sword in his hand. The bull was the symbolic animal of Hadad on which he often depicted as standing on the bull’s back. The bull’s head that symbolizes Hadad can be seen on coins dating back to the 4th century BC, which were unearthed near the ancient Aramean city of Mabbug, which the Greeks called Hierapolis (“sacred city”). The main temple built in Hadad’s name was located in Aram-Damascus. The fate of this temple is remarkable, under the Roman Empire it was rebuilt as a Temple of Jupiter, during Byzantine times it was turned into a church and after the Arab conquest of Syria it became the biggest mosque of modern day Syria, named Umayyad Mosque. The name Bar-Hadad, which several Aramean kings bore, literally means son of Hadad. It was a royal title, so no one else had the right to be called by that name. Eventually the name lost its distinction, and despite its pagan origins, the Arameans preserved the name after the adoption of Christianity. After the Arameans became christianized there even was a bishop called Bar-Hadad.

It appears from their inscriptions as well as from their names that the Arameans also worshipped other Mesopotamian gods such as Sin, Ishtar (whom they called ʿAṯtart; in Greek: Astarte), Shamash, Tammuz, Bel and Nergal, but also some Canaanite-Phoenician deities such as the storm-god, El, the supreme deity of Canaan, in addition to Anat (‘Atta) and others.

=== Language ===
With the spread of the Arameans in large numbers throughout Mesopotamia and the Levant the Aramaic language became the lingua franca of the whole Middle-East. It has served as a language of public life and administration of ancient kingdoms and empires, and also as a language of divine worship and religious study. It subsequently branched into several Neo-Aramaic languages that are still spoken in modern times.

=== Architecture and art ===
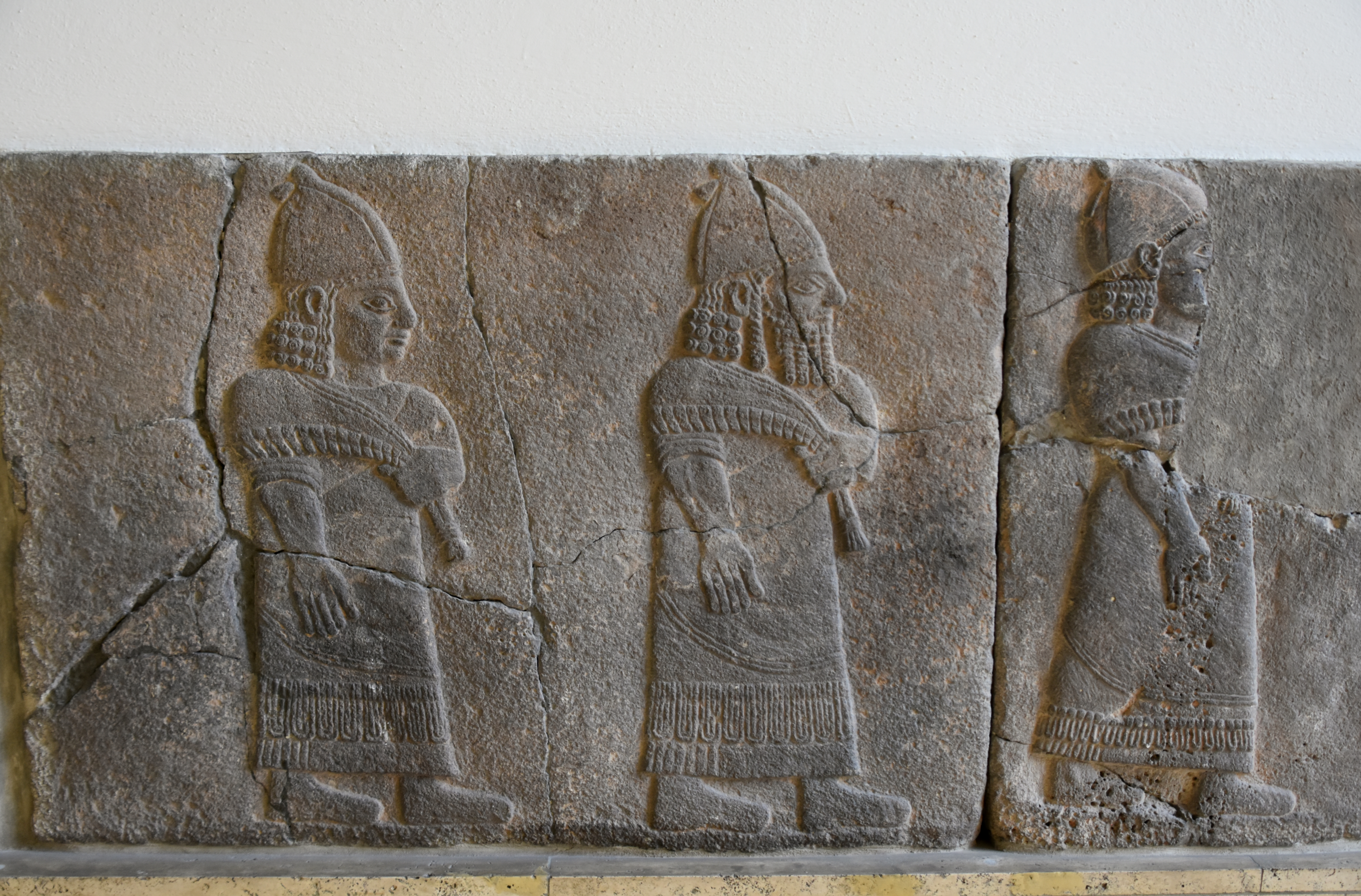
Relief from the Aramean citadel of Bit Gabbari

Aramean cities were enclosed by a city wall and a fortified upper town or citadel on which palaces and other representative buildings are located. The entrance of the palaces of the kings mostly included several steles of winged bulls or lions as a sign of power and dominance. Surprisingly, no temples have been excavated on the citadels of the major Aramean cities. The only remarkable exception is the temple in antis in Tell Afis. The fact that the main temple of Sam'al was not located in the capital city but on the rocky hill called Gerçin about seven kilometers north of Zincirli may indicate different solutions in the use of religious spaces.

The Aramean kings showed a different headgear and stylization of hair and beard compared to other nations at that time. They distinguished themselves by their exclusive headgears, medium-length beards and large curved noses. Especially a braid hanging down in front of their headgear was a typical form of Aramean art.

== See also ==
- Arameans
- Aramean states
- Aram-Damascus
- Aram-Naharaim
- Aramean kings
- Neo-Hittite states
- Aramaic language
- Aramaic studies

== Sources ==
- Abousamra, Gaby (2019). "Biblical Ṣobah: A Location Attempt". Aramaean Borders: Defining Aramaean Territories in the 10th–8th Centuries B.C.E. Leiden-Boston: Brill. pp. 229–244. ISBN 9789004398535.
- Akopian, Arman (2017). Introduction to Aramean and Syriac Studies: A Manual. Piscataway, NJ: Gorgias Handbooks. ISBN 9781463238933.
- Amadasi-Guzzo, Maria Giulia (2019). "What Do We Know about the Borders and Exchanges between Aram and Phoenicia in the 9th–8th Centuries B.C.E. in Anatolia and Syria?". Aramaean Borders: Defining Aramaean Territories in the 10th–8th Centuries B.C.E. Leiden-Boston: Brill. pp. 149–171. ISBN 9789004398535.
- Bagg, Ariel M. (2019). "At the Limits of Historical Geography: Reconstructing Aramaean Territories in the West According to the Neo-Assyrian Written Sources". Aramaean Borders: Defining Aramaean Territories in the 10th–8th Centuries B.C.E. Leiden-Boston: Brill. pp. 1–25. ISBN 9789004398535.
- Beyer, Klaus (1986). The Aramaic Language: Its Distribution and Subdivisions. Göttingen: Vandenhoeck & Ruprecht. ISBN 9783525535738.
- Brock, Sebastian P. (1992a) [1985]. The Luminous Eye: The Spiritual World Vision of Saint Ephrem (2nd revised ed.). Kalamazoo: Cistercian Publications. ISBN 9780879075248.
- Brock, Sebastian P. (1992b). "Eusebius and Syriac Christianity". Eusebius, Christianity, and Judaism. Detroit: Wayne State University Press. pp. 212–234. ISBN 0814323618.
- Creason, Stuart (2008). "Aramaic" (PDF). The Ancient Languages of Syria-Palestine and Arabia. Cambridge: Cambridge University Press. pp. 108–44.
- Dušek, Jan (2019). "The Kingdom of Arpad/Bīt-Agūsi: Its Capital, and Its Borders". Aramaean Borders: Defining Aramaean Territories in the 10th–8th Centuries B.C.E. Leiden-Boston: Brill. pp. 172–202. ISBN 9789004398535.
- Edmonds, Alexander J. (2019). "A People without Borders? Tracing the Shifting Identities and Territorialities of the Ahlameans". Aramaean Borders: Defining Aramaean Territories in the 10th–8th Centuries B.C.E. Leiden-Boston: Brill. pp. 26–62. ISBN 9789004398535.
- Gzella, Holger (2015). A Cultural History of Aramaic: From the Beginnings to the Advent of Islam. Leiden-Boston: Brill. ISBN 9789004285101.
- Lipiński, Edward (2000). The Aramaeans: Their Ancient History, Culture, Religion. Leuven: Peeters Publishers. ISBN 9789042908598.
- Lipiński, Edward (2013). "The Aramaeans in the West (13th–8th centuries)". Arameans, Chaldeans, and Arabs in Babylonia and Palestine in the First Millennium B.C. Wiesbaden: Harrassowitz Verlag. pp. 123–147. ISBN 9783447065443.
- Lemaire, André (2019). "The Boundary between the Aramaean Kingdom of Damascus and the Kingdom of Israel". Aramaean Borders: Defining Aramaean Territories in the 10th–8th Centuries B.C.E. Leiden-Boston: Brill. pp. 245–266. ISBN 9789004398535.
- Luukko, Mikko (2019). "Gurraeans and Ituʾaeans in the Service of the Assyrian Empire". Aramaean Borders: Defining Aramaean Territories in the 10th–8th Centuries B.C.E. Leiden-Boston: Brill. pp. 92–124. ISBN 9789004398535.
- Marf, Dlshad A. (2019). "The Aramaean Presence in the Northern Zagros during the Middle and Neo-Assyrian Periods". Aramaean Borders: Defining Aramaean Territories in the 10th–8th Centuries B.C.E. Leiden-Boston: Brill. pp. 78–91. ISBN 9789004398535.
- Messo, Johny (2011). "The Origin of the Terms Syria(n) and Suryoyo: Once Again". Parole de l'Orient. 36: 111–125.
- Minov, Sergey (2020). Memory and Identity in the Syriac Cave of Treasures: Rewriting the Bible in Sasanian Iran. Leiden-Boston: Brill. ISBN 9789004445512.
- Mynářová, Jana; Dušek, Jan (2019). "The Tell Fekheriye Inscription and the Western Assyrian Border in the Late 9th Century B.C.E.". Aramaean Borders: Defining Aramaean Territories in the 10th–8th Centuries B.C.E. Leiden-Boston: Brill. pp. 63–77. ISBN 9789004398535.
- Richelle, Matthieu (2019). "The Fluctuating Borders of Hamath (10th–8th Centuries B.C.E.)". Aramaean Borders: Defining Aramaean Territories in the 10th–8th Centuries B.C.E. Leiden-Boston: Brill. pp. 203–228. ISBN 9789004398535.
- Rollinger, Robert (2006). "The Terms Assyria and Syria Again" (PDF). Journal of Near Eastern Studies. 65 (4): 283–287. doi:10.1086/511103. S2CID 162760021.
- Sader, Hélène (1992). "The 12th Century B.C. in Syria: The Problem of the Rise of the Aramaeans". The Crisis Years: The 12th Century B.C. from beyond the Danube to the Tigris. Dubuque: Kendall-Hunt. pp. 157–164.
- Sader, Hélène (2000). "The Aramaean Kingdoms of Syria: Origin and Formation Processes". Essays on Syria in the Iron Age. Louvain: Peeters Press. pp. 61–76. ISBN 9789042908789.
- Sader, Hélène (2010). "The Aramaeans of Syria: Some Considerations on their Origin and Material Culture". The Books of Kings: Sources, Composition, Historiography and Reception. Leiden-Boston: Brill. pp. 273–300. ISBN 978-9004177291.
- Sader, Hélène (2014). "History". The Aramaeans in Ancient Syria. Leiden: Brill. pp. 11–36. ISBN 9789004229433.
- Sader, Hélène (2016). "The Formation and Decline of the Aramaean States in Iron Age Syria". State Formation and State Decline in the Near and Middle East. Wiesbaden: Harrassowitz Verlag. pp. 61–76. ISBN 9783447105651.
- Simon, Zsolt (2019). "Aramaean Borders: the Hieroglyphic Luwian Evidence". Aramaean Borders: Defining Aramaean Territories in the 10th–8th Centuries B.C.E. Leiden-Boston: Brill. pp. 125–148. ISBN 9789004398535.
- Sokoloff, Michael, ed. (1983). Arameans, Aramaic and the Aramaic Literary Tradition. Tel Aviv: Bar Ilan University Press.
- Younger, Kenneth Lawson (2016). A Political History of the Arameans: From Their Origins to the End of Their Polities. Atlanta: SBL Press. ISBN 9781628370843.
- Zwickel, Wolfgang (2019). "Borders between Aram-Damascus and Israel: A Historical Investigation". Aramaean Borders: Defining Aramaean Territories in the 10th–8th Centuries B.C.E. Leiden-Boston: Brill. pp. 267–335. ISBN 9789004398535.
