= Hezion =

King of Aram-Damascus

Hezion may refer to two kings of Aram-Damascus.

== 10th–9th century BCE ==
Hezion

King of Aram Damascus
- Reign: before 887 BCE
- Successor: Tabrimmon
- Issue: Tabrimmon (son)

According to the genealogy given in the Books of Kings (1 Kings 15:18), Hezion was a king of Aram-Damascus, where Ben-Hadad I is said to be the "son of Tabrimmon, the son of Hezion, king of Aram, who lived in Damascus." The passage in 1 Kings refers to King Asa of Judah, who is dated by several scholars to not later than 866 BCE. In the 19th century many scholars equated him with Rezon the Syrian, an enemy of Solomon.

Regnal titles
Preceded by Unknown	King of Aram-Damascus before 886 BCE	Succeeded by Tabrimmon

== 8th century BCE ==
Ḫadiānu

King of Aram-Damascus
- Reign: attested 773 BCE
- Predecessor: Possibly Ben-Hadad III
- Successor: Possibly Rezin

Ḫadiānu (also called Hezion II) was an eighth-century BCE king of Aram-Damascus. He is attested in the Pazarcık Stele, composed during the reign of Shalmaneser IV and dated to 773 BCE. The inscription states that the Assyrian commander Šamši-ilu marched to Damascus and received tribute from Ḫadiānu.

The designation Hezion II reflects the identification of Ḫadiānu with the name of the earlier, biblical Hezion. William F. Albright had previously argued that biblical Hezion was cognate with Hadianu. After the discovery of the Pazarcık inscription, Wayne Pitard suggested that the eighth-century ruler might have borne the same name as the earlier Hezion, although he considered the identification uncertain. Stefan Timm subsequently referred to the ruler as Hesion II. K. Lawson Younger renders the name as Ḥaḏyān II and its Assyrian form as Ḫadiānu.

Regnal titles
Preceded by Possibly Ben-Hadad III	King of Aram-Damascus circa 773 BCE	Succeeded by Possibly Rezin

== See also ==
- Aramean kings
