= Aram Rehob =

Aram Rehob was a kingdom mentioned in the Hebrew Bible, of which the chief city was Rehob or Beth-Rehob, associated with Aram-Zobah as hostile to King David. Num. xiii.21 and Judges xviii.28 place a Beth-Rehob in the Lebanon region near Tel Dan. Moore (Commentary on Judges, p. 399) conjecturally identifies it with Paneas.

== See also ==
- Hebrew Bible
- Zobah

== Sources ==
- Gzella, Holger (2015). A Cultural History of Aramaic: From the Beginnings to the Advent of Islam. Leiden-Boston: Brill. ISBN 9789004285101.
- Lipiński, Edward (2000). The Aramaeans: Their Ancient History, Culture, Religion. Leuven: Peeters Publishers. ISBN 9789042908598.
- Sader, Hélène (2010). "The Aramaeans of Syria: Some Considerations on their Origin and Material Culture". The Books of Kings: Sources, Composition, Historiography and Reception. Leiden-Boston: Brill. pp. 273–300. ISBN 978-9004177291.
- Younger, Kenneth Lawson (2016). A Political History of the Arameans: From Their Origins to the End of Their Polities. Atlanta: SBL Press. ISBN 9781628370843.
