= Tabrimmon =

Aramaean king

King of Aram Damascus
- Reign: ?–886 BC
- Predecessor: Hezion
- Successor: Ben-Hadad I
- Issue: Ben-Hadad I (son)
- Father: Hezion

Tabrimmon (Hebrew: טַבְרִמֹּ֚ן Ṭaḇrīmmon), also as Tabrimon, also as Tabremon in Douay–Rheims, was an Aramaean king, but there is little known about him. According to the Bible, he is the son of Hezion and the father of Ben-Hadad I:

Then Asa took all the silver and the gold that were left in the treasures of the house of Jehovah, and the treasures of the king’s house, and delivered them into the hand of his servants; and king Asa sent them to Ben-hadad, the son of Tabrimmon, the son of Hezion, king of Syria, that dwelt at Damascus, saying, . . . --1 Kings 15:18, American Standard Version

Regnal titles
Preceded by Hezion	King of Aram-Damascus before 885 BCE	Succeeded by Possibly Ben-Hadad I

== See also ==
- List of Syrian monarchs
- Timeline of Syrian history
- Aramean kings
