= Hadad the Edomite =

Member of the royal house of Edom

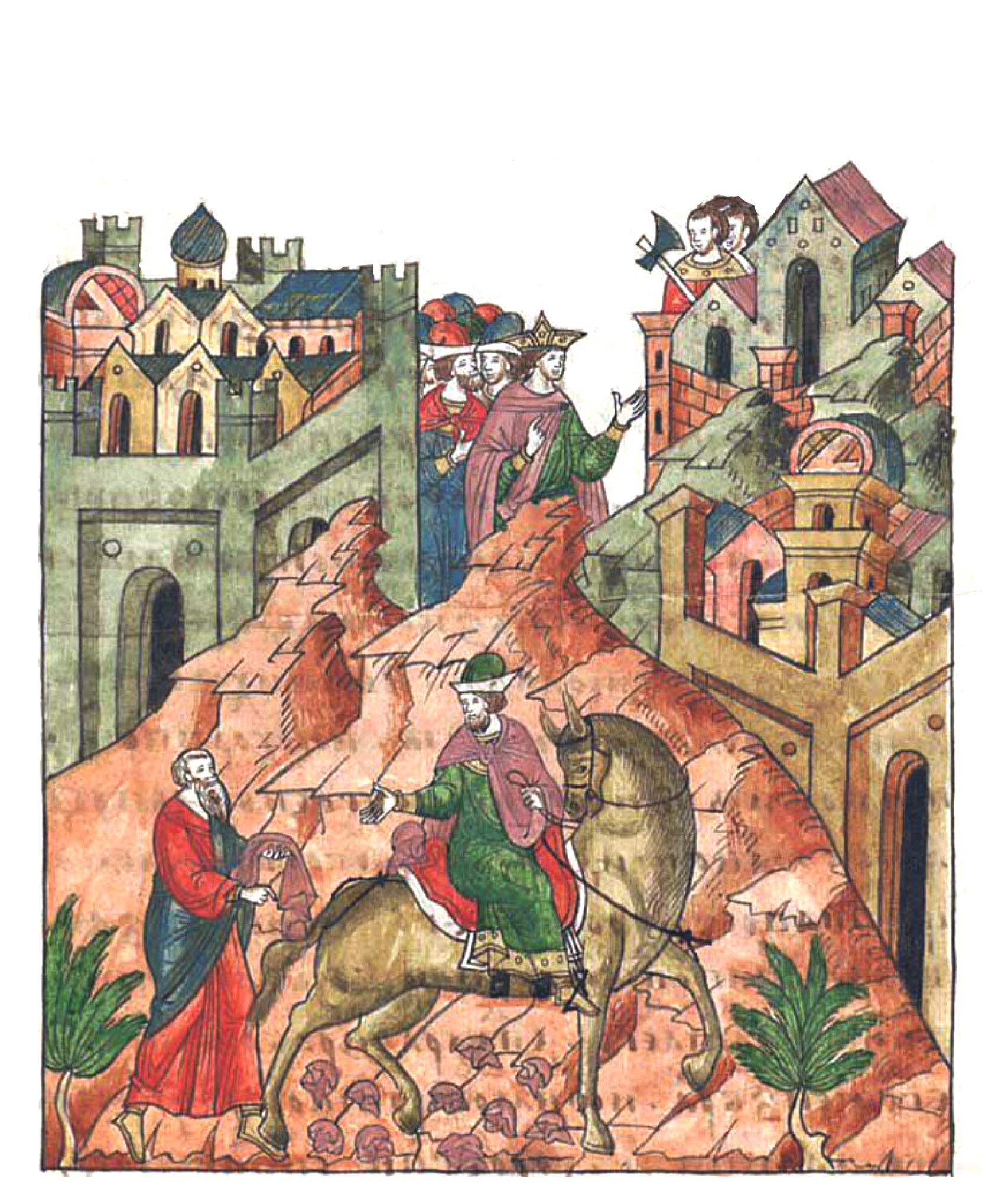

Hadad the Edomite is a character mentioned in the First Book of Kings who was an adversary of King Solomon after Solomon turned to idols. Some scholars believe the text should read Hadad the Aramean.

And the LORD raised up an adversary against Solomon, Hadad the Edomite.

— 1 Kings 11:14, ESV

According to the account in 1 Kings, Hadad was a survivor of the royal house of Edom after the slaughter at the hands of Joab. He escaped as a child to Egypt, where he was raised by Pharaoh and married the queen's sister. After the death of King David, Hadad returned to try to reclaim the throne of Edom. Hadad's campaign to recapture Edom apparently met with success, as 1 Kings 11:25 states that another of Solomon's adversaries, Rezon the son of Eliada, did harm to Solomon "as Hadad did".

Along with Rezon the Syrian, Hadad is one of two characters described as a satan to Solomon, a word which was left untranslated and transliterated into Greek letters in the Septuagint.

According to David Mandel, Hadad's rule can be dated to the tenth century BCE.
