= Antiochus IX Cyzicenus =

Seleucid King of Syria from 116 to 95 BC

- Antiochus IX Eusebes Cyzicenus
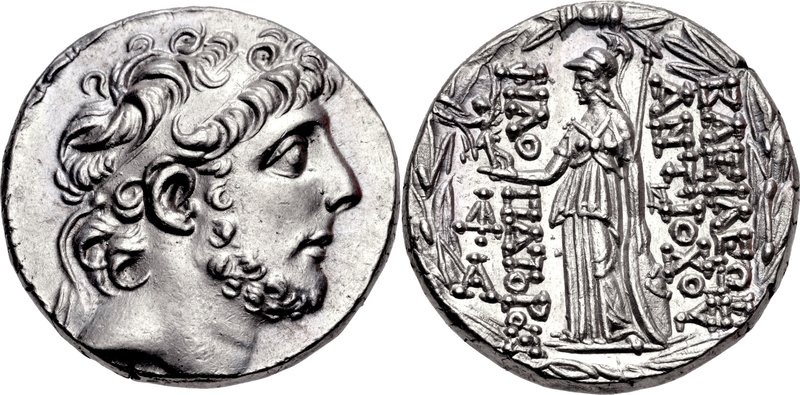
- Tetradrachm of Antiochos IX, with Athena Nike on the reverse, minted at Antioch circa 110-109 BC.

King of Syria
- Reign: 116–95 BC
- Predecessor: Antiochus VIII
- Successors: Seleucus VI, Demetrius III
- Contenders: Antiochus VIII (116–96 BC); Seleucus VI (96–95 BC); Demetrius III (96–95 BC)
- Born: Unknown
- Died: 96 BC
- Spouse: Cleopatra IV (married c. 115–112 BC); Cleopatra Selene of Syria (married 96 BC)
- Issue: Antiochus X Eusebes
- Dynasty: Seleucid
- Father: Antiochus VII Sidetes
- Mother: Cleopatra Thea

Antiochus IX Eusebes Cyzicenus (Greek: Ἀντίοχος Εὐσεβής Κυζικηνός, "Antiochus the Pious, the Cyzicene") was a ruler of the Hellenistic Seleucid kingdom. He was the son of Antiochus VII and Cleopatra Thea. He left the kingdom in 129 BC and went to the city of Cyzicus, but he returned in 116 BC to challenge his half-brother Antiochus VIII for power.

The siblings fought a twenty-year civil war. In 112 BC, Antiochus IX's wife, Cleopatra IV, was killed by her sister Tryphaena, the wife of Antiochus VIII. Tryphaena herself died shortly afterwards. Antiochus VIII was assassinated in 96 BC; he was succeeded by his sons Seleucus VI and Demetrius III. Antiochus IX then took the capital Antioch and married his deceased wife's sister Cleopatra Selene, who was herself the widow of Antiochus VIII. Seleucus VI continued the war against his uncle. Antiochus IX Eusebes Cyzicenus was killed in battle in 95 BC.

== Biography ==
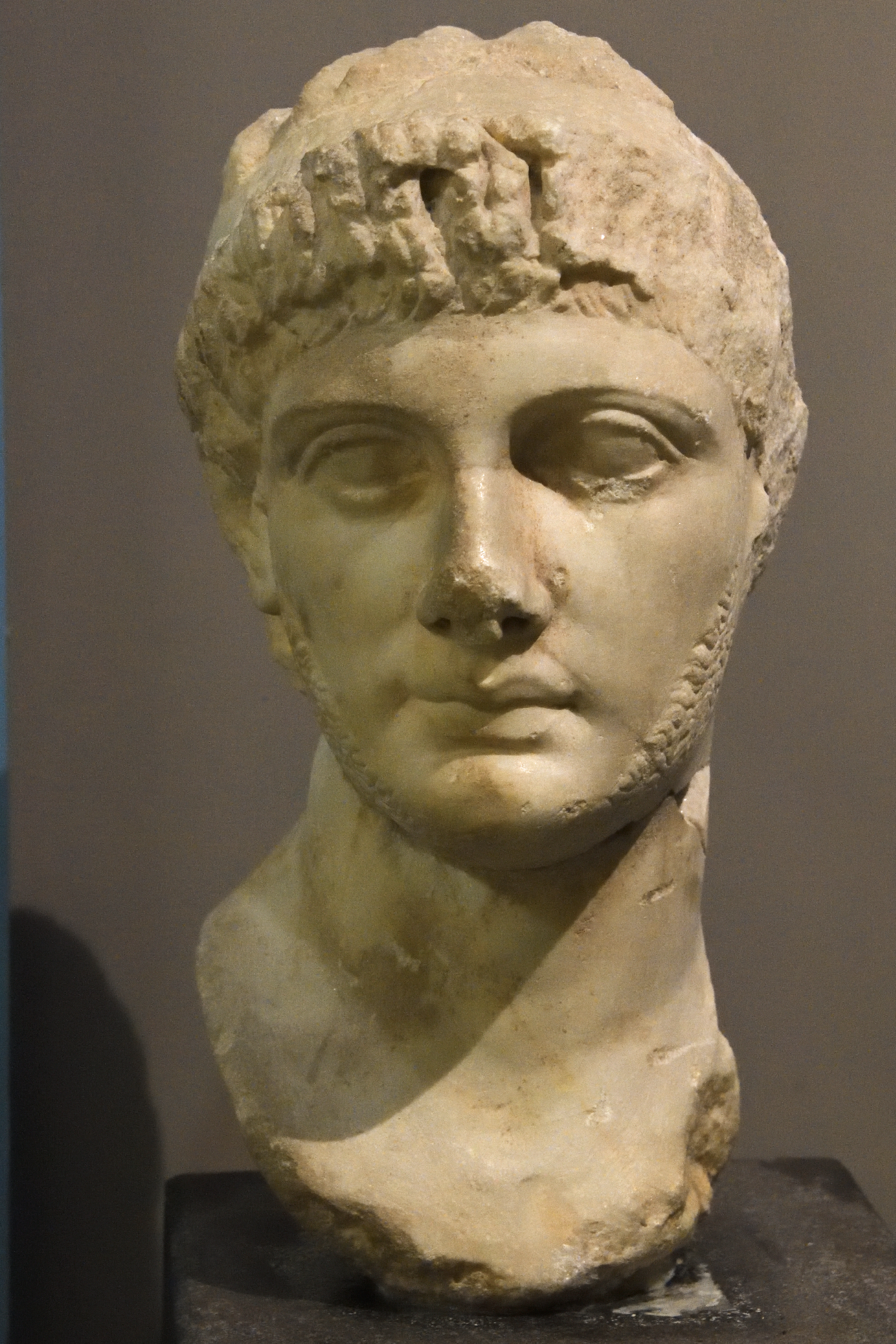
Bust probably depicting Antiochus IX.

The son of Antiochus VII and Cleopatra Thea, upon the death of his father in Parthia and his uncle Demetrius II's return to power (129 BC), his mother sent him to Cyzicus on the Bosporus, thus giving him his nickname.

Following the death of his mother c. 121 BC, Antiochus IX Cyzicenus challenged his half-brother, Antiochus VIII, for power over Syria.

He returned to Syria in 116 BC to claim the Seleucid throne from Antiochus VIII, with whom he eventually divided Syria, that same year.

Antiochus IX was first married to Cleopatra IV, who was said to have been killed in 112 BC by her sister and rival Tryphaena, wife of Antiochus VIII. Antiochus VIII was assassinated in 96 BC. Antiochus IX then captured Antioch and married his brother's widow, Cleopatra Selene, who was the sister of Cleopatra IV.

Antiochus IX was subsequently killed in battle against Antiochus VIII's son Seleucus VI later in 96 BC.

== Legacy ==
Antiochus IX probably created the Iturean tetrarchy as an ally against Antiochus VIII.

== See also ==
- List of Syrian monarchs
- Timeline of Syrian history

== Sources ==
- Wright, Nicholas L. (2005). "Seleucid Royal Cult, Indigenous Religious Traditions and Radiate Crowns: The Numismatic Evidence". Mediterranean Archaeology. 18. Sydney University Press: 81. ISSN 1030-8482.
- Vermeule, Cornelius (1970). "Near Eastern, Greek, and Roman Gems: A Recent Gift to the Collections". Boston Museum Bulletin. 68 (353). Museum of Fine Arts, Boston: 197–214. JSTOR 4171534. OCLC 866801443.

Antiochus IX Cyzicenus Seleucid dynasty Born: Unknown Died: 96 BC
| Preceded by Antiochus VIII | Seleucid King (King of Syria); 114–95 BC with Antiochus VIII (116–95 BC) | Succeeded by Seleucus VI and Demetrius III |
