= Rezin =

King of Aram-Damascus, also known as Rasin of Syria

Rezin C H
- Rasin of Syria
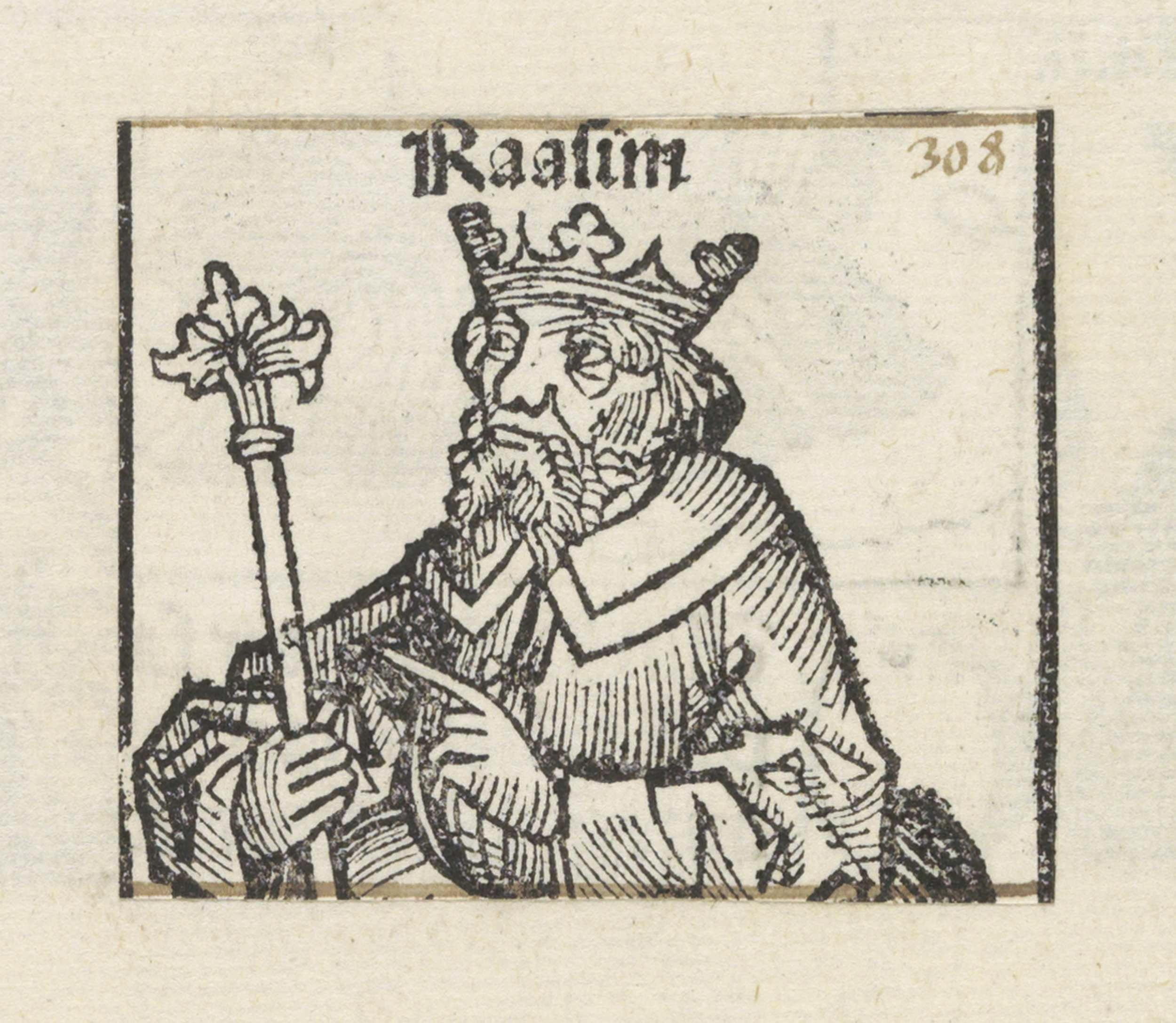
- Woodcut of King Rezin in the Nuremberg Chronicle by Hartmann Schedel, 1493

King of Aram-Damascus
- Reign: 754–732 BC
- Predecessor: Ben-Hadad III or Hezion
- Successor: Monarchy abolished
- Co-regent: Tributary King of King Tiglath-Pileser III of Assyria
- Born: Unknown; Presumably Damascus
- Died: 732 BC; Damascus

Rezin of Aram (/rəˈziːn, ˈriːzɪn/, Hebrew: רְצִין, Modern: Rəṣīn, Tiberian: Reṣīn; Akkadian: 𒊏𒄭𒀀𒉡/𒊏𒆥𒀀𒉡, romanized: Ra-ḫi-a-nu/Ra-qi-a-nu; Imperial Aramaic: probably *Raḍyan; Latin: Rasin) was an Aramean King ruling from Damascus during the 8th century BC.

== Reign ==
During his reign, he was a tributary of King Tiglath-Pileser III of Assyria (r. 745-727 BC).

=== Rebellion ===
Rezin conspired with a number of Levantine kings (e.g., Hiram II of Tyre) to rebel against Tiglath-Pileser III. Rezin's reign ended in 732 BC, when Tiglath-Pileser III sacked Damascus and annexed Aram:

In order to save his life, he (Raḫiānu) fled alone and entered the gate of his city [like] a mongoose. I [im]paled his foremost men alive while making (the people of) his land watch. For forty-five days I set up my camp [aro]und his city and confined him (there) like a bird in a cage. I cut down his plantations, [...] ..., (and) orchards, which were without number; I did not leave a single one (standing). I surrounded (and) captured [the city ...]ḫādara, the ancestral home of Raḫiānu (Rezin) of the land Damascus, [the pl]ace where he was born. I carried off 800 people, with their possessions, their oxen, (and) their sheep and goats. I carried off 750 captives from the cities Kuruṣṣâ (and) Samāya, (as well as) 550 captives from the city Metuna. Like tell(s) after the Deluge, I destroyed 591 cities of 16 districts of the land Damascus. (RINAP 1, Tiglath-Pileser III 20, l. 8’-17’)

Assyrian inscriptions indicate that Tiglath-pileser made a three-year campaign in the Levant from 734 to 732 BC. In the first year he attacked the Phoenicians and sacked the coastal cities of Tyre and Sidon. In the second year he devastated the land of Aram and the Arabs living in the Trans-Jordan under Queen Shamsi. Although he beat the Arameans in the field, he failed to take Damascus. In the third year he managed to take Damascus, where he slew King Rezin. He also destroyed and leveled the villages in Northern Israel. He boasted of slaying King Pekah, and he installed Hoshea on the throne. Only the fortified capital of Samaria remained, and the entire land was brought low. Archaeology confirms that many cities destroyed during this time period were never rebuilt.

According to the Bible (2 Kings 16), the sack of Damascus was instigated by King Ahaz of Judah and ended in Rezin's execution (2 Kings 16:7–9). The execution of Rezin is neither confirmed nor disconfirmed by independent evidence.

According to 2 Kings 16, Rezin, king of Aram-Damascus, allied with Pekah, son of Remaliah and king of Israel, against Ahaz, king of Judah, following the latter’s refusal to join their coalition against Assyria. During the ensuing conflict, known as the Syro-Ephraimite War, the prophet Isaiah urged Ahaz to place his trust in God rather than seek foreign assistance, assuring him that the two opposing kings would be defeated. As a sign of this promise, Isaiah foretold the birth of a child named Immanuel, meaning “God is with us” (Isaiah 7:14), and declared that before the child learned to reject evil and choose good, the lands ruled by the two kings would be deserted (Isaiah 7:15–16). Nevertheless, Ahaz sought assistance from the Assyrian king Tiglath-pileser III (2 Kings 16:7–9).

== See also ==
- List of biblical figures identified in extra-biblical sources
- List of Syrian monarchs
- Timeline of Syrian history
- Syro-Ephraimite War

Preceded by Hezion	King of Aram-Damascus; 754–732 BC	Succeeded by None
