= Berothah =

Berothah (Hebrew bērôṯâ) is a city named in Ezekiel 47:16, located on the northern boundary of the ideal state of Israel. It is probably to be identified with Berothai (bērôṯay), an ancient Syrian city ruled by Hadadezer bar Rehob, king of Zobah, in the early tenth century BCE. According to II Samuel 8:8, King David of Israel pillaged the city of a great quantity of bronze or copper.

The site of Berothai is probably the modern-day village of Bereitân (Brital), 13 km (8 mi) south of Baalbek.

== See also ==
- Ezekiel 47
