= Hadadezer =

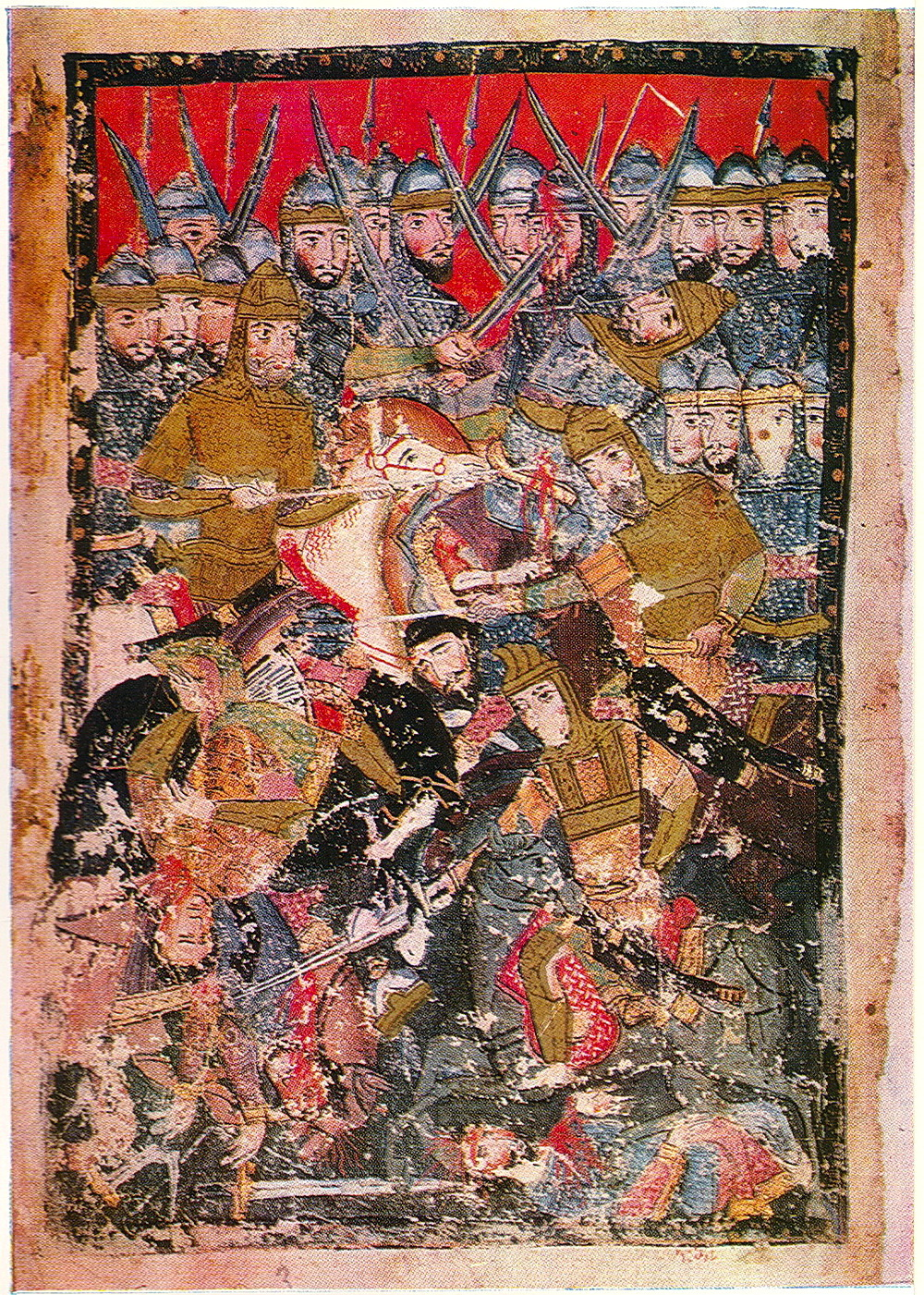
- Battle of the Israelites against King Hadadezer from a Georgian manuscript, 1665.

King of Aram-Damascus
- Reign: 865–842 BC
- Predecessor: Ben-Hadad I
- Successor: Hazael
- Died: 842 BC

Hadadezer (Imperial Aramaic: הַדִדעֶזֶר, romanized: Haḏiḏ-ʿezer /ˌhædəˈdiːzər/; "[the god] Hadad is help"), also known as Adad-Idri (Akkadian: 𒀭𒅎𒀉𒊑, romanized: ^{d}IM-id-ri), and possibly the same as Bar- or Ben-Hadad II, was the king of Aram-Damascus between 865 and 842 BC.

The Hebrew Bible states that Hadadezer (which the biblical text calls ben Hadad, not to be confused with Ben-Hadad I and Ben-Hadad III) engaged in a war against king Ahab of the Kingdom of Israel (Samaria), but was defeated and captured by him. However, soon after that, the two kings signed a peace treaty and established an alliance according to 1 Kings 20.

According to the Kurkh Monoliths, Hadadezer and Irhuleni of Hamath later led a coalition of eleven kings (including Ahab of Israel and Gindibu of the Arab) at the Battle of Qarqar against the Assyrian king Shalmaneser III. He fought Shalmaneser six other times, twice more with the aid of Irhuleni and with an unspecified coalition.

The biblical text reports that, after a few years, Ahab and Jehoshaphat of the Kingdom of Judah formed an alliance against Hadadezer, starting a war against him; however, Aram-Damascus was able to defeat them, and Ahab was killed during the battle according to 1 Kings 22.

According to 2 Kings 8 and to an inscription of the Assyrian king Shalmaneser III, Hadad-Ezer was succeeded by Hazael after his death. The biblical account claims that Hazael murdered him.

== See also ==
- Timeline of Syrian history
- List of Aramean kings

== Notes ==
Preceded by Ben-Hadad I	King of Aram-Damascus; 865–842 BC	Succeeded by Hazael
