= Hazael =

King of Aram-Damascus

- Our Lord
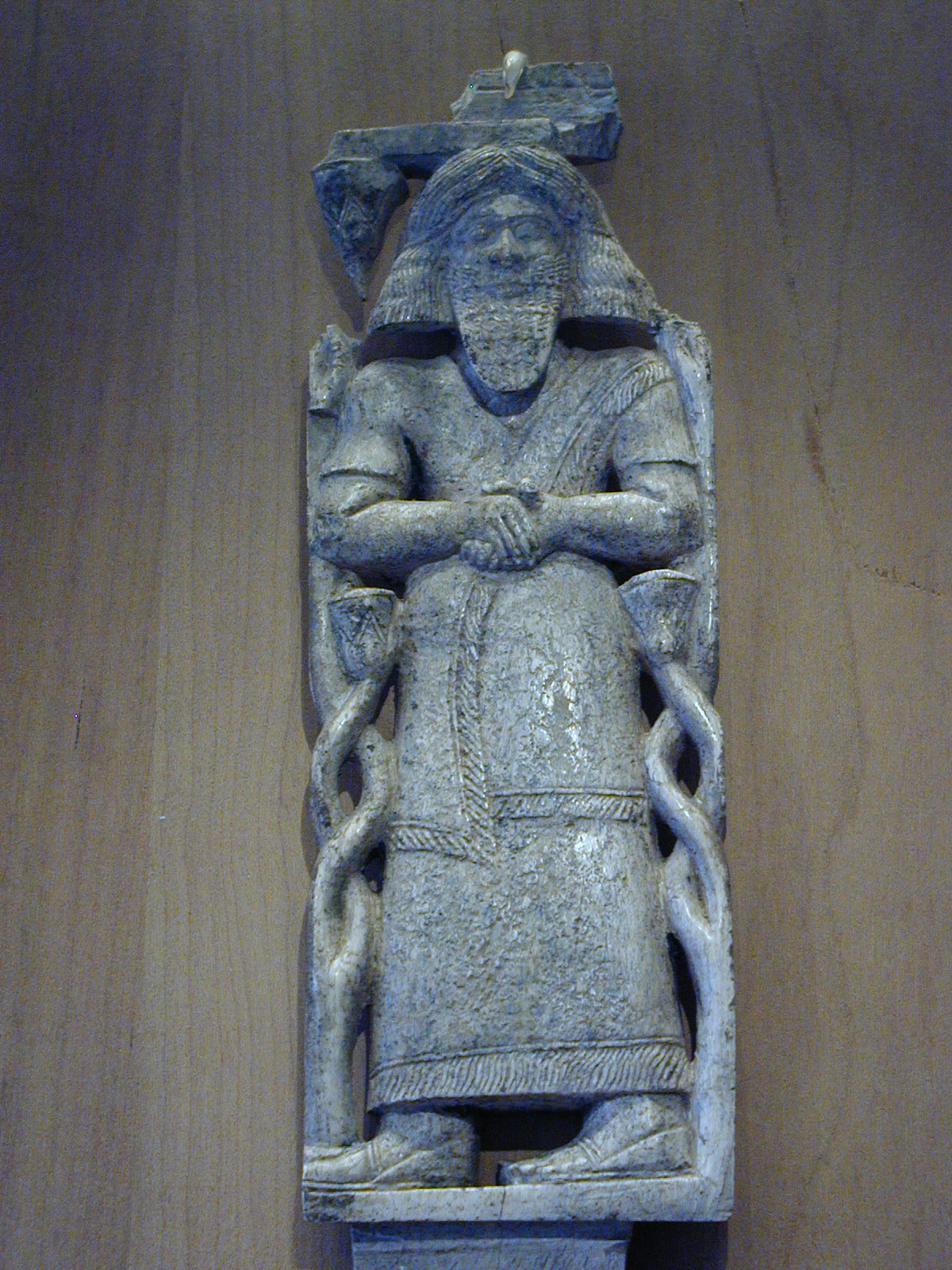
- Ivory Inlay of Hazael

King of Aram Damascus
- Reign: 842–796 BC
- Predecessor: Hadadezer
- Successor: Ben-Hadad III
- Died: 796 BC
- Issue: Ben-Hadad III
- Occupation: Court official

Hazael (/ˈheɪziəl/; Biblical Hebrew: חֲזָאֵל or חֲזָהאֵל, romanized: Ḥăzāʾēl; Old Aramaic 𐤇𐤆𐤀𐤋 Ḥzʔl) was a king of Aram-Damascus mentioned in the Bible. Under his reign, Aram-Damascus became an empire that ruled over large parts of contemporary Syria and historical Palestine. While he was likely born in the greater Damascus region of today, his place of birth is unknown, with both Bashan and the Beqaa Valley being favoured by different historians.

== In the Bible ==
Hazael is first mentioned by name in 1 Kings 19:15. God tells Elijah the prophet to anoint Hazael king of Syria. Years after this, the Syrian king Ben-Hadad II, probably identical to the Hadadezer mentioned in the Tel Dan stele, was ill and sent his court official Hazael with gifts to Elijah's successor, Elisha. Elisha told Hazael to tell Hadadezer that he would recover and revealed to Hazael that the king would recover but would be assassinated. He also predicted that Hazael would commit atrocities against the Israelites. Hazael denies that he is capable of perpetrating such deeds. Elisha predicts that Hazael will be king of Syria; he returns to Damascus the next day and tells Hadadezer he will recover but suffocates Hadadezer and seizes power himself.

During his reign, King Hazael led the Arameans in a battle against the allied forces of Jehoram of Israel and Ahaziah of Judah. After defeating them at Ramoth-Gilead, Hazael repelled two attacks by the Assyrians, seized Israelite territory east of the Jordan River (2 Kings 10:32–33), and the Philistine city of Gath. Although unsuccessful, he also sought to take Jerusalem (2 Kings 12:17–18). Hazael's death is mentioned in 2 Kings 13:24.

== Tel Dan stele ==
A monumental Aramaic inscription discovered at Tel Dan is seen by most scholars as having been erected by Hazael, after he defeated the kings of Israel and Judah. Recent excavations at Tell es-Safi/Gath have revealed dramatic evidence of the siege and subsequent conquest of Gath by Hazael. An archaeomagnetic study has suggested that the sites of Tell Zeitah, Tel Rehov and Horvat Tevet were destroyed by Hazael's campaign.

== Items belonging to Hazael ==
=== Bronze plaques ===
Decorated bronze plaques from chariot horse-harness taken from Hazael, identified by their inscriptions, have been found as re-gifted votive objects at two Greek sites, the Heraion of Samos and in the temple of Apollo at Eretria on Euboea. The inscriptions read "that which Hadad gave to our lord Hazael from 'Umq in the year that our lord crossed the River". The river must be the Orontes. The triangular front pieces show a "Master of the animals" gripping inverted sphinxes or lions in either hand, and with goddesses who stand on the heads of lions. When Tiglath-Pileser III took Damascus in 733/2, these heirlooms were part of the loot that fell eventually into Greek, probably Euboean hands.

=== Arslan Tash ivories ===
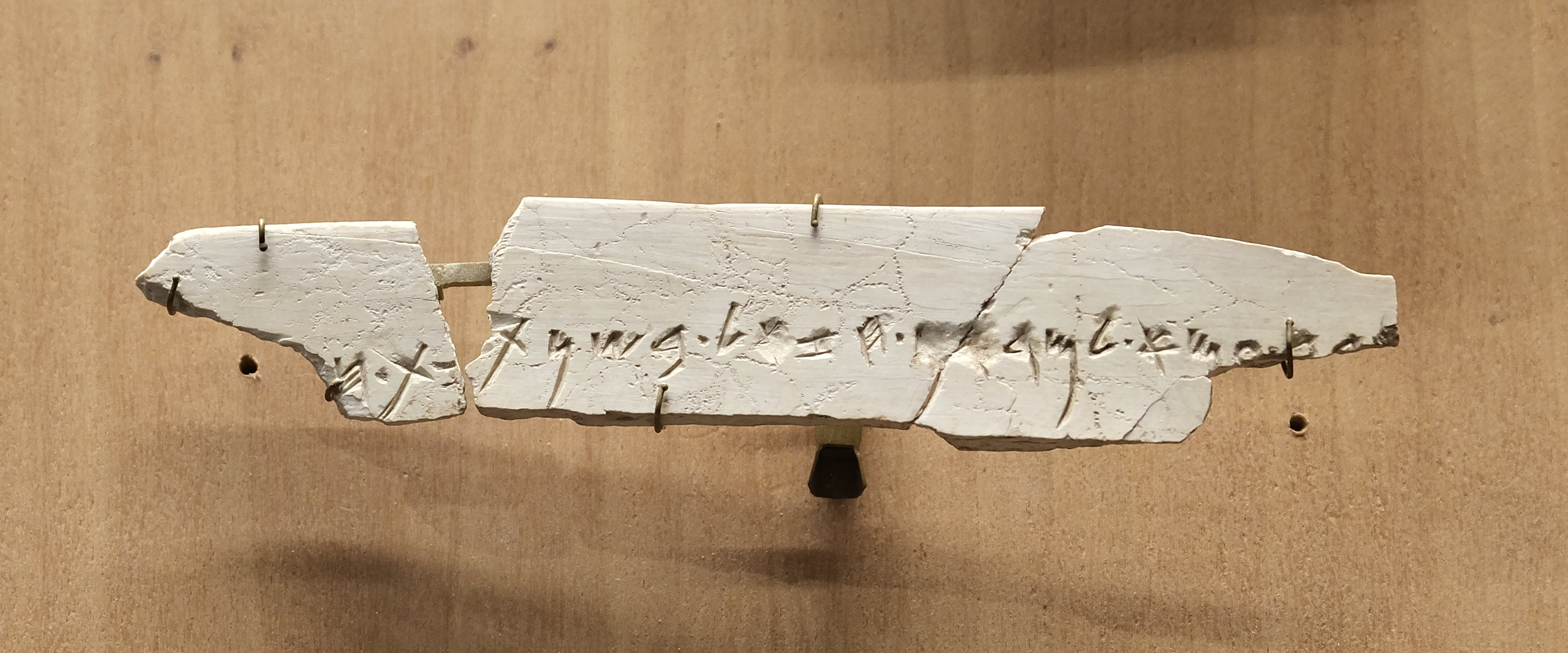
Arslan Tash ivory inscription

A set of ivory bed decorations were found in 1928 in Arslan Tash in northern Syria (ancient Hadātu) by a team of French archaeologists. Among them is the Arslan Tash ivory inscription in Old Aramaic that carries the name 'Hazael' (𐤇𐤆𐤀𐤋 ḤZʔL); this bed seems to have belonged to king Hazael of Aram-Damascus. The inscription is known as KAI 232.

Also, some fragmentary ivories mentioning Hazael were found in Nimrud, Iraq.

== See also ==
- List of biblical figures identified in extra-biblical sources
- Timeline of Syrian history

== Notes ==
| Preceded by Hadadezer | King of Aram-Damascus; 842–796 BC | Succeeded by Ben-Hadad III |
