= Zobah =

Early Aramean state mentioned in the Hebrew Bible

Zobah or Aram-Zobah (Hebrew: אֲרָם צוֹבָא, romanized: ʾĂrām Ṣōḇāʾ) was an early Aramean state and former vassal kingdom of Israel mentioned in the Hebrew Bible that extended northeast of David's realm according to the Hebrew Bible.

Alexander Kirkpatrick, in the Cambridge Bible for Schools and Colleges (1896), places it broadly between Damascus and the Euphrates. It is thought by some to have extended from the Beqaa Valley along the eastern side of the Anti-Lebanon Mountains, reaching Hama to the north and Damascus to the south, making it at one time a state of considerable importance.

== Middle Bronze Age ==
The earliest extrabiblical attestation of Zobah occurs in an Old Babylonian tablet unearthed at Mari (M. 5423) that describes the campaign of the troops of Mari, led by Išhî-Addu, king of Qaṭna, to the Beqaa Valley. The tablet describes the city of Ṣîbat (probably identical to biblical Zobah and the Neo-Assyrian city of Ṣubat) as among the cities conquered by the king's troops.

== Iron Age ==
=== In the Hebrew Bible ===
In 1 Samuel 14:47, the kings of Zobah were said to have fought with the Israelite king Saul. Kirkpatrick suggests that "the 'kings' were independent chiefs", but by the time of David, there was a single king, Hadadezer bar Rehob. Later, King Hadadezer bar Rehob allied with Ammon against King David, who defeated Zobah and made the kingdom tributary to Israel (2 Samuel 10). In this war, Arameans from across the Euphrates came to Hadadezer's aid (2 Sam. 10:16). Upon the accession of Solomon, Zobah became independent of Israel (compare 1 Kings 11:23 et seq.).

The chapter-heading of Psalm 60 in the New King James Version refers to Zobah. In the Revised Standard Version and the New American Bible (Revised Edition), the reference is to Aram-Zobah.

=== Assyrian period ===
During the Neo-Assyrian period, Ṣubat is mentioned in the annals of Tiglath-Pileser III (745–727 BC) as the capital of a province following his conquests in the region. The Assyrian records also name two local governors: Šamaš-aḫu-iddina and Bēl-liqbi.

Zobah is also attested as Ṣbh in Aramaic graffiti from the 8th century BC that were found in Hama.

== Medieval Rabbinical sources ==
From the 11th century, it was common Rabbinic usage to apply the term "Aram-Zobah" to the area of Aleppo, and this is perpetuated by Syrian Jews to this day. However, Saadia Gaon (882‒942 CE), in his Judeo-Arabic translation (tafsīr) of the Psalms identified Aram-zobah with Nisibis.

== Identification attempts ==
Based on the biblical narrative, primarily from the Books of Kings and 2 Samuel, Berothai, a city belonging to Hadadezer (2 Sam. 8:8) is identified by many with Berothah (Ezekiel 47:16), which was between Hamath and Damascus. Zobah was probably located near this city, though Joseph Halévy claims to have identified Zobah with Chalcis. On the later view, the area in question would be found in the far north of Syria and parts of Turkey.

Some sources indicate that Zobah city is the modern city of Homs in Syria, or Anjar in Lebanon's Bekaa Valley.

According to Edward Lipiński, the location of the capital city of Ṣoba corresponds to the present archaeological site of Tell Deir in the Beqaa Valley of modern-day Lebanon. Gaby Abousamra connects Zobah with the modern-day village of Zabbud, also in Lebanon. Nadav Na'aman suggests Al-Qusayr north of Riblah as one possible candidate for the biblical city.

== See also ==
- Aleppo Codex, Hebrew Bible manuscript called in Hebrew "Keter Aram-Zoba", meaning "Crown of Aleppo"
- Aram-Damascus, another Iron Age Aramean kingdom
- Hamath-zobah, biblical city
- Homs, city in Syria

== Bibliography ==
- Abousamra, Gaby (2019). "Biblical Ṣobah: A Location Attempt". In Dušek, Jan; Mynářová, Jana (eds.). Aramaean Borders: Defining Aramaean Territories in the 10th–8th Centuries B.C.E. Leiden-Boston: Brill. ISBN 978-90-04-39853-5.
- Charpin, Dominique (1998). "Toponymie Amorrite Et Toponymie Biblique: La Ville De Ṣîbat/Ṣobah". Revue d'Assyriologie et d'archéologie orientale. 92 (1): 79–92. ISSN 0373-6032. JSTOR 23282084.
- Jastrow, Jr., Morris; Barton, George A. (1902). "Aram-zobah". In Singer, Isidore; et al. (eds.). The Jewish Encyclopedia. Vol. 2. New York: Funk & Wagnalls.
- Lipiński, Edward (2000). The Aramaeans: Their Ancient History, Culture, Religion. Orientalia Lovaniensia analecta. Vol. 100. Leuven, Belgium: Peeters Publishers. ISBN 978-9-042-90859-8.
- Na'aman, Nadav (2022). "The District of Ṣubat/Ṣupitu in the longue durée Perspective". State Archives of Assyria Bulletin. 29: 39–52. ISSN 1120-4699.
- Porter, Josias Leslie (1868). Giant Cities of Bashan; and Syria's Holy Places. T. Nelson and Sons.
