= Ben-Hadad I =

King of Aram-Damascus from 885 BCE to 865 BCE

King of Aram Damascus
- Reign: 885–865 BCE
- Predecessor: Hezion (or Tabrimmon)
- Successor: Ben-Hadad II
- Father: Tabrimmon

Ben-Hadad I (Hebrew: בֶּן־הֲדַד, romanized: Ben-Hăḏaḏ), son of Tabrimmon and grandson of Hezion, was king of Aram-Damascus between 885 BCE and 865 BCE. Ben-Hadad I was reportedly a contemporary of kings Baasha of the Kingdom of Israel and Asa of the Kingdom of Judah.

According to the Biblical book of Kings, Asa called on Ben-Hadad I to aid him in attacking northern Israel while Baasha restricted access to Jerusalem through border fortifications. Ben-Hadad took the towns of "Ijon, Dan, Abel-beth-maachah, and all Chinneroth, with all the land of Naphtali" (1 Kings 15:20). This acquisition gave Aram-Damascus control of the trade route to southern Phoenicia. By the time of the reign of Ahab, the area was back in Israelite hands.

According to the archaeologist William Foxwell Albright, the Melqart stele should be attributed to Ben-Hadad I. However, Kenneth Kitchen disagrees and states that there is no actual evidence that connects that stele to this particular king.

== See also ==
- Aramean kings

Preceded by Tabrimmon	King of Aram Damascus; 885–865 BCE	Succeeded by Hadadezer
