= Aram-Damascus =

Aramean polity from 12th century BCE to 732 BCE

Coordinates: 33.5130°N 36.2920°E

- c. 12th century BCE–732 BCE
- Capital: Damascus
- Common languages: Old Aramaic
- Religion: Ancient Semitic religion
- King
  - 885–865 BCE: Ben-Hadad I
  - 865–842 BCE: Ben-Hadad II
  - 842–796 BCE: Hazael
  - 796–792 BCE: Ben-Hadad III
  - 754–732 BCE: Rezin (last)
- History
  - Established: c. 12th century BCE
  - Assyrian conquest: 732 BCE
Preceded by	Succeeded by
Aramean states	Neo-Assyrian Empire
- Today part of: Syria; Jordan; Israel; Lebanon

Aram-Damascus (/ˈærəm ... / ARR-əm ...) was an Aramean polity that existed from the late 12th century BCE to 732 BCE and was centred on the city of Damascus, in the Southern Levant. Alongside various tribal lands, it was bounded in its later years by the polities of Assyria to the north, Ammon to the south, and Israel to the west.

The compound name "Aram-Damascus" is found only in the Hebrew Bible, where it sometimes also is referred to as simply "Aram" or "Damascus". It is also referred to as "Aram" in some Aramaic inscriptions. In Assyrian sources, "Aram" was never used to designate it, which was often referred to as "Damascus" or "imērīšu" (meaning "his donkey") and sometimes as "Bīt-Ḫaza’ili" (meaning "house of Hazael"), in Assyrian sources.

== History ==
The Tanakh gives accounts of the history of Aram-Damascus, mainly in its interaction with Israel and Judah. There are biblical texts referencing battles that took place between the United Kingdom of Israel under David and the Arameans in Southern Syria in the 10th century BCE.

In the 9th century BCE, Hazael fought against the Assyrians, had some influence over the northern Syrian state of Unqi, and conquered Israel.

To the southwest, Aram-Damascus reached most of the Golan to the Sea of Galilee.

In the 8th century BCE, Rezin had been a tributary of Tiglath-Pileser III, a king of Assyria. In c. 732 BCE, he formed an alliance with Pekah, a king of Israel, to attack Ahaz, a king of Judah; Ahaz appealed to Tiglath-Pileser III for help, which was provided by the Assyrian king after Judah paid tribute. Subsequently, Tiglath-Pileser III attacked Damascus and annexed Aram. The kingdom's population was deported, and Rezin was executed. Tiglath-Pileser III recorded the act in one of his inscriptions.

== Kings ==
- Hezion, ca. 960 BCE
- Tabrimmon, ca. 930 BCE, son of Hezion
- Ben-Hadad I, 885–865 BCE
- Ben-Hadad II, 865–842 BCE
- Hazael, 842–805/796 BCE, usurper
- Ben-Hadad III, 796–792 BCE, son of Hazael
- Rezin, 754 BCE–732 BCE

== See also ==
- Aram (region), a historical region in the Levant mentioned in the Bible
- Aram Rehob, an early Aramean kingdom

== Sources ==
- Amadasi-Guzzo, Maria Giulia (2019). "What Do We Know about the Borders and Exchanges between Aram and Phoenicia in the 9th–8th Centuries B.C.E. in Anatolia and Syria?". Aramaean Borders: Defining Aramaean Territories in the 10th–8th Centuries B.C.E. Leiden-Boston: Brill. pp. 149–171. ISBN 9789004398535.
- Bagg, Ariel M. (2019). "At the Limits of Historical Geography: Reconstructing Aramaean Territories in the West According to the Neo-Assyrian Written Sources". Aramaean Borders: Defining Aramaean Territories in the 10th–8th Centuries B.C.E. Leiden-Boston: Brill. pp. 1–25. ISBN 9789004398535.
- Edmonds, Alexander J. (2019). "A People without Borders? Tracing the Shifting Identities and Territorialities of the Ahlameans". Aramaean Borders: Defining Aramaean Territories in the 10th–8th Centuries B.C.E. Leiden-Boston: Brill. pp. 26–62. ISBN 9789004398535.
- Gzella, Holger (2015). A Cultural History of Aramaic: From the Beginnings to the Advent of Islam. Leiden-Boston: Brill. ISBN 9789004285101.
- Lipiński, Edward (2000). The Aramaeans: Their Ancient History, Culture, Religion. Leuven: Peeters Publishers. ISBN 9789042908598.
- Lipiński, Edward (2013). "The Aramaeans in the West (13th–8th centuries)". Arameans, Chaldeans, and Arabs in Babylonia and Palestine in the First Millennium B.C. Wiesbaden: Harrassowitz Verlag. pp. 123–147. ISBN 9783447065443.
- Lemaire, André (2019). "The Boundary between the Aramaean Kingdom of Damascus and the Kingdom of Israel". Aramaean Borders: Defining Aramaean Territories in the 10th–8th Centuries B.C.E. Leiden-Boston: Brill. pp. 245–266. ISBN 9789004398535.
- Sader, Hélène (2014). "History". The Aramaeans in Ancient Syria. Leiden: Brill. pp. 11–36. ISBN 9789004229433.
- Younger, Kenneth Lawson (2016). A Political History of the Arameans: From Their Origins to the End of Their Polities. Atlanta: SBL Press. ISBN 9781628370843.
- Zwickel, Wolfgang (2019). "Borders between Aram-Damascus and Israel: A Historical Investigation". Aramaean Borders: Defining Aramaean Territories in the 10th–8th Centuries B.C.E. Leiden-Boston: Brill. pp. 267–335. ISBN 9789004398535.
