= Ben-Hadad III =

Bar-Hadad III
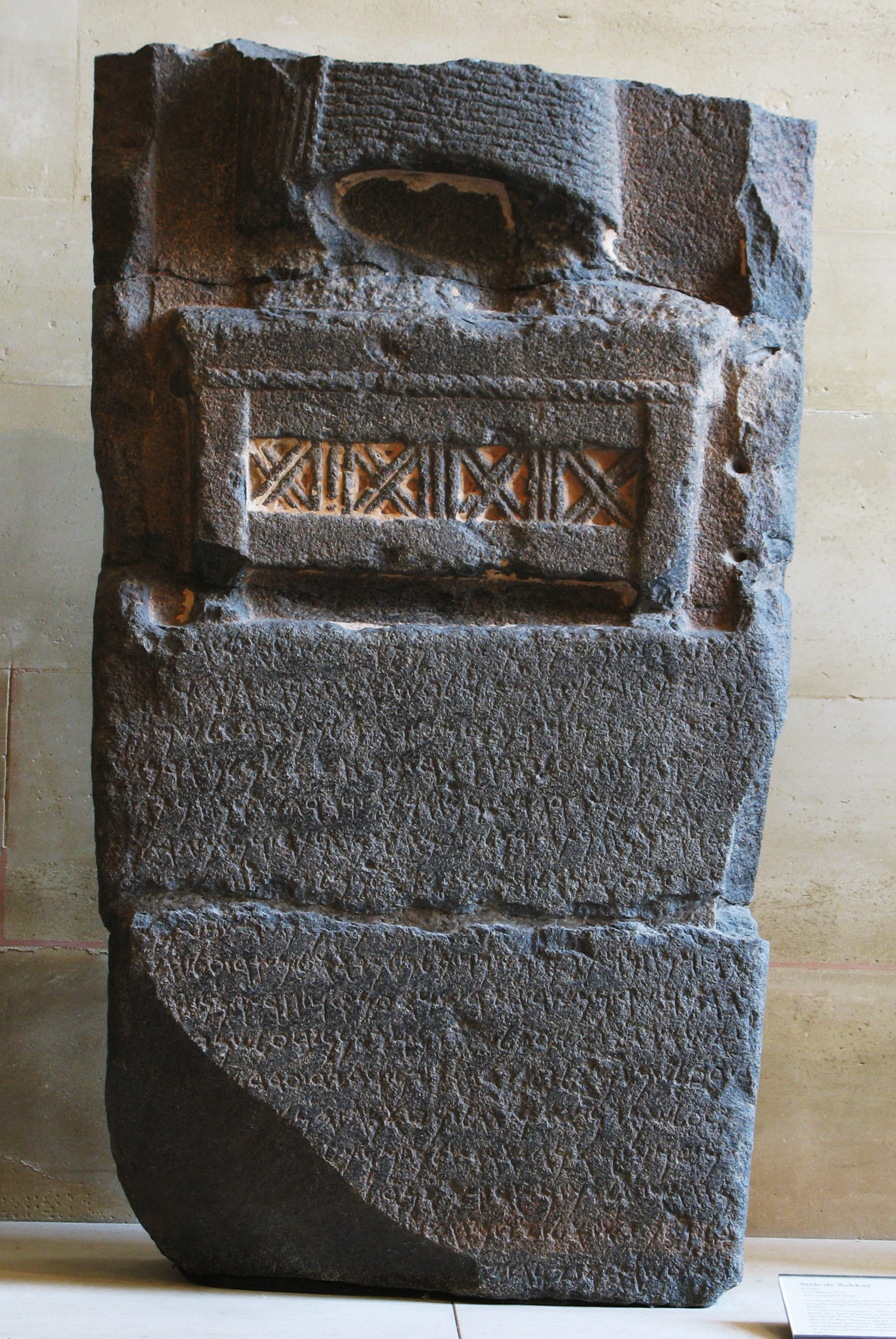
- Stele of Zakkur

King of Aram Damascus
- Reign: 796–792 BC (possible)
- Predecessor: Hazael
- Successor: Rezin
- Died: 792 BC
- Father: Hazael

Bar-Hadad III (Aram.) (ܒܪ ܚܕܕ) or Ben-Hadad III (Heb.) (בֶּן-הֲדַד) was king of Aram Damascus, the son and successor of Hazael. His succession is mentioned in 2 Kings (13:3, 13:24). He is thought to have ruled from 796 BC to 792 BC, although there are many conflicting opinions among Biblical archaeologists as to the length of his reign.

The archaeological Stele of Zakkur mentions "Bar Hadad, son of Hazael".

== See also ==
- List of biblical figures identified in extra-biblical sources
- List of Syrian monarchs
- Timeline of Syrian history
- Zakkur

Preceded by Hazael	King of Aram-Damascus; 796–792 BC	Succeeded by Rezin
