= Edward Lipiński (orientalist) =

Polish-Belgian Biblical scholar and Orientalist (born 1930)

- Born: 18 June 1930; Łódź, Poland
- Died: 12 April 2024 (aged 93); Brussels, Belgium
- Occupations: Biblical and Oriental scholar

Edward Lipiński, or Edouard Lipiński (born 18 June 1930 in Łódź, Poland and deceased on 12 April 2024 in Brussels, Belgium), was a Polish-Belgian Biblical scholar and Orientalist, professor and exegete at the Katholieke Universiteit Leuven.

== Life ==
His first major work, published in 1965, was a monumental monograph, La royauté de Yahwé dans la poésie et le culte de l'ancien Israël. In 1969, he was appointed professor at the Catholic University of Leuven, where he taught the comparative grammar of Semitic languages, the history of ancient Near Eastern religions and institutions and other things.

He was head of the Department of Oriental and Slavonic studies at the Katholieke Universiteit Leuven from 1978 to 1984. He directed the publication of the Dictionnaire de la civilisation phénicienne et punique (1992) and the Studia Phoenicia series (from 1983).

He also published Semitic Languages. Outline of a Comparative Grammar (1997, 2001) and dealt extensively with Old Aramaic dialects and history, in particular in his Studies in Aramaic Inscriptions and Onomastics (1975, 1994, 2010, 2016) and in The Aramaeans: Their Ancient History, Culture, Religion (2000).

Referring to the last work, a reviewer noted that it "embodies the accumulated insights of one of the greatest Semitic scholars of our time". He was awarded a doctorate honoris causa by the Lund University in 2003. Although he retired in 1995, he continued teaching and doing research, mainly in Aramaic and Phoenician studies. He died in Brussels, Belgium on 12 April 2024.

== Works ==
The WorldCat database lists over a hundred publications by Edward Lipiński in his various fields of expertise.

A complete bibliography was published by The Enigma Press. Here is a short list of his major publications:

- La Royauté de Yahwé dans la poésie et le culte de l'ancien Israël (Verhandelingen van de Koninklijke Vlaamse Academie voor Wetenschappen, Letteren en Schone Kunsten van België. Klasse der Letteren, Jaarg. XXVII, Nr 55), Paleis der Academiën, Brussel 1965, 560 pp.; second edition, Brussel 1968.
- Le Poème royal du Psaume LXXXIX, 1-5.20-38 (Cahiers de la Revue Biblique 6), J. Gabalda et Cie, Paris 1967, 110 pp.
- Lipiński, Edward (1975). Studies in Aramaic Inscriptions and Onomastics. Vol. 1. Leuven: Peeters Publishers. ISBN 978-90-6186-019-8.
  - Lipiński, Edward (1994). Studies in Aramaic Inscriptions and Onomastics. Vol. 2. Leuven: Peeters Publishers. ISBN 978-90-6831-610-0.
    - Lipiński, Edward (2010). Studies in Aramaic Inscriptions and Onomastics. Vol. 3. Leuven: Peeters Publishers. ISBN 978-90-429-2380-5.
      - Lipiński, Edward (2016). Studies in Aramaic Inscriptions and Onomastics. Vol. 4. Leuven: Peeters Publishers.
- Author of volumes 1, 5 and 6 of Studia Paulo Naster Oblata: Orientalia antiqua published 1982 Peeters Publishers
- (Ed.), Dictionnaire de la civilisation phénicienne et punique, Brepols, Turnhout 1992, XXII + 502 p., 14 colour pls.
- Dieux et déesses de l'univers phénicien et punique (Orient. Lov. An. 64; Studia Phoenicia XIV), Peeters & Departement Oosterse Studies, Leuven 1995, 536 p.
- Lipiński, Edward (1997). Semitic Languages: Outline of a Comparative Grammar (1st ed.). Leuven: Peeters Publishers. ISBN 978-90-6831-939-2.
  - Lipiński, Edward (2001) [1997]. Semitic Languages: Outline of a Comparative Grammar (2nd ed.). Leuven: Peeters Publishers. ISBN 978-90-429-0815-4.
- Lipiński, Edward (2000). The Aramaeans: Their Ancient History, Culture, Religion. Leuven: Peeters Publishers. ISBN 978-90-429-0859-8.
- Lipiński, Edward (2004). Itineraria Phoenicia. Leuven: Peeters Publishers. ISBN 978-90-429-1344-8.
- Lipiński, Edward (2006). On the Skirts of Canaan in the Iron Age: Historical and Topographical Researches. Leuven: Peeters Publishers. ISBN 978-90-429-1798-9.
- Prawo bliskowschodnie w starożytności. Wprowadzenie historyczne (The Near Eastern Law in Antiquity. A Historical Introduction; Studia historico-biblica 2), Wydawnictwo KUL, Lublin 2009, 492 pp.
- Resheph. A Syro-Canaanite Deity (Orient. Lov. An. 181; Studia Phoenicia XIX), Peeters & Departement Oosterse Studies, Leuven 2009, 297 pp.
- Lipiński, Edward (2013). "The Aramaeans in the West (13th–8th centuries)". Arameans, Chaldeans, and Arabs in Babylonia and Palestine in the First Millennium B.C. Wiesbaden: Harrassowitz Verlag. pp. 123–147. ISBN 978-3-447-06544-3.
