= Aramean-Syriac flag =

Ethnic flag

Syriac-Aramean flag
- Use: Ethnic flag
- Adopted: 1982
- Design: Winged sun on red background
- Designed by: Joanis Almasudi Youssef

The Aramean flag or Syriac-Aramean flag is the flag of the Syriac-Aramean people. A first version, similar to the current one, was developed in 1980 by Bahro Suryoyo ("Syriac light"), a Syriac journal part of the Syrianska Riksförbundet i Sverige (English: Syriac Federation in Sweden (Note: "Syrianska" being a new word in the Swedish vocabulary due to the name dispute, here translated as "Syriac".)). The current version was developed in early 1982.

The World Council of Arameans, an international non-government organization, approved of the flag on July 16, 1983, in New Jersey. The design was based on the Winged sun symbol, replacing the sun with a torch symbolising the Holy Spirit in Christianity.

== Symbolism ==
The design is specifically based on a relief depicting Gilgamesh between two bull-men supporting a winged sun disk, excavated in 1927 by the German archaeologist Max von Oppenheim (1860–1946) and the French semitologist André Dupont-Sommer (1900–1983) at Tell Halaf the former Aramean city-state of Bit Bahiani, which is located on the border of Tur Abdin region, today located in the Al Hasakah governorate of northeastern Syria. The relief was part of the entrance of the palace of the Aramean king Kapara.

The main characteristic of the flag is the eagle, which stands for strength and power. The sun disk is replaced by a flame to symbolize, according to Syrianska Riksförbundet, the Holy Spirit and the Christian heritage of the Syriac people. Syrianska Riksförbundet further say that the four stars represent the rivers in the Aramean homeland: Tigris, Euphrates, the Gihon and the Pishon; the red background of the flag was chosen to represent the blood that was spilled during the Syriac Genocide; the yellow color represents the hope of an independent Syriac-Aramean state. It is intended to represent "the Aramean (Syriac) nation in the Aramean homeland and in the Aramean diaspora".

== Gallery ==
Syriac flag, adopted in 1980

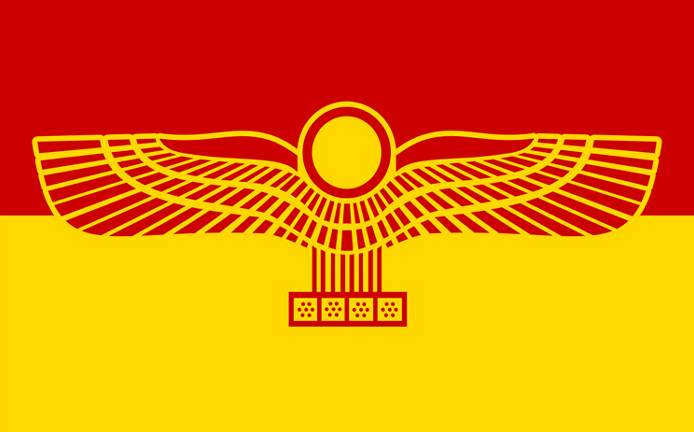
Earlier version of the flag, used by the Aramean Democratic Organization

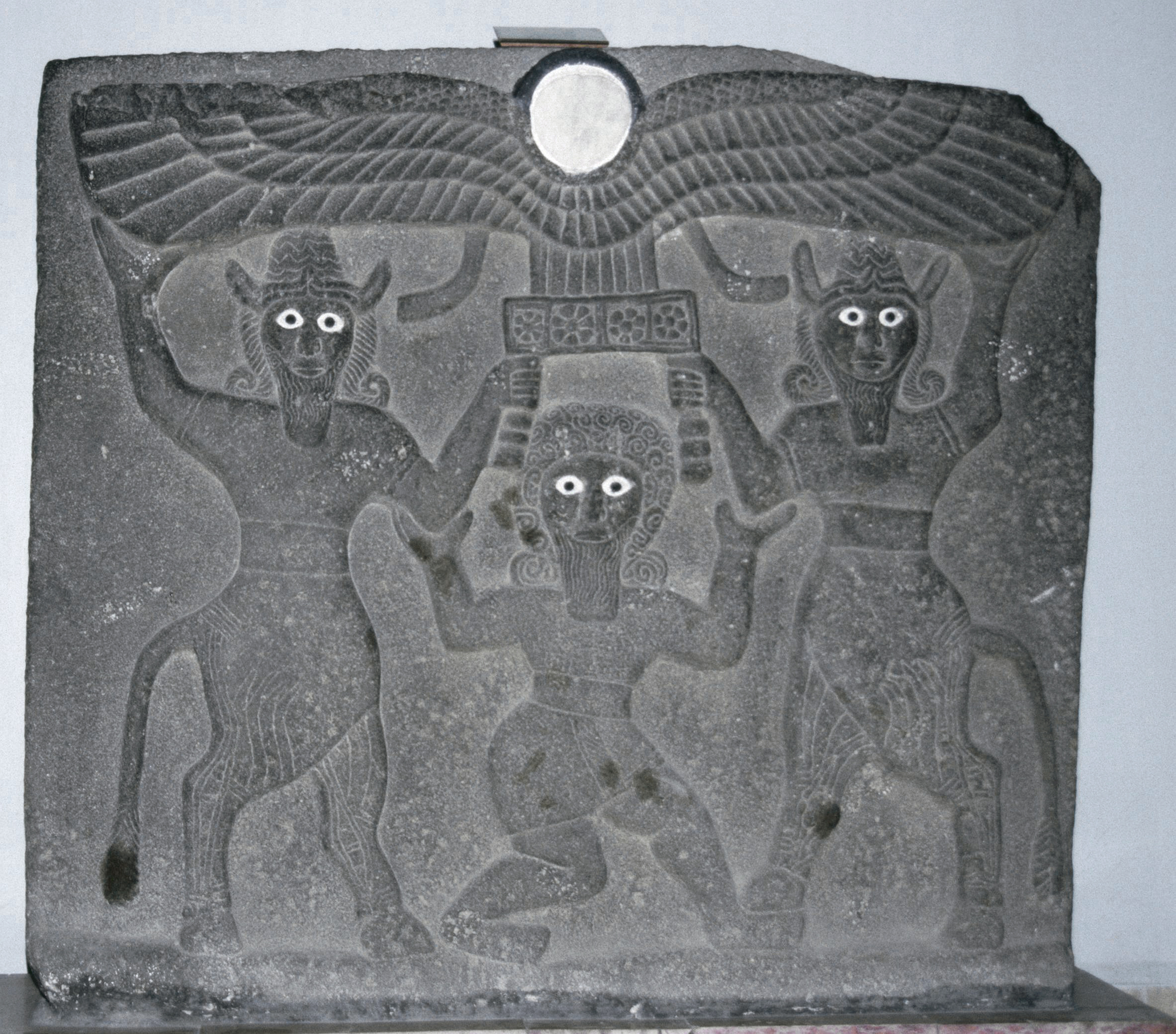
Relief found in Tell Halaf
