= Bit-hilani =

Ancient building type from Syria and Mesopotamia

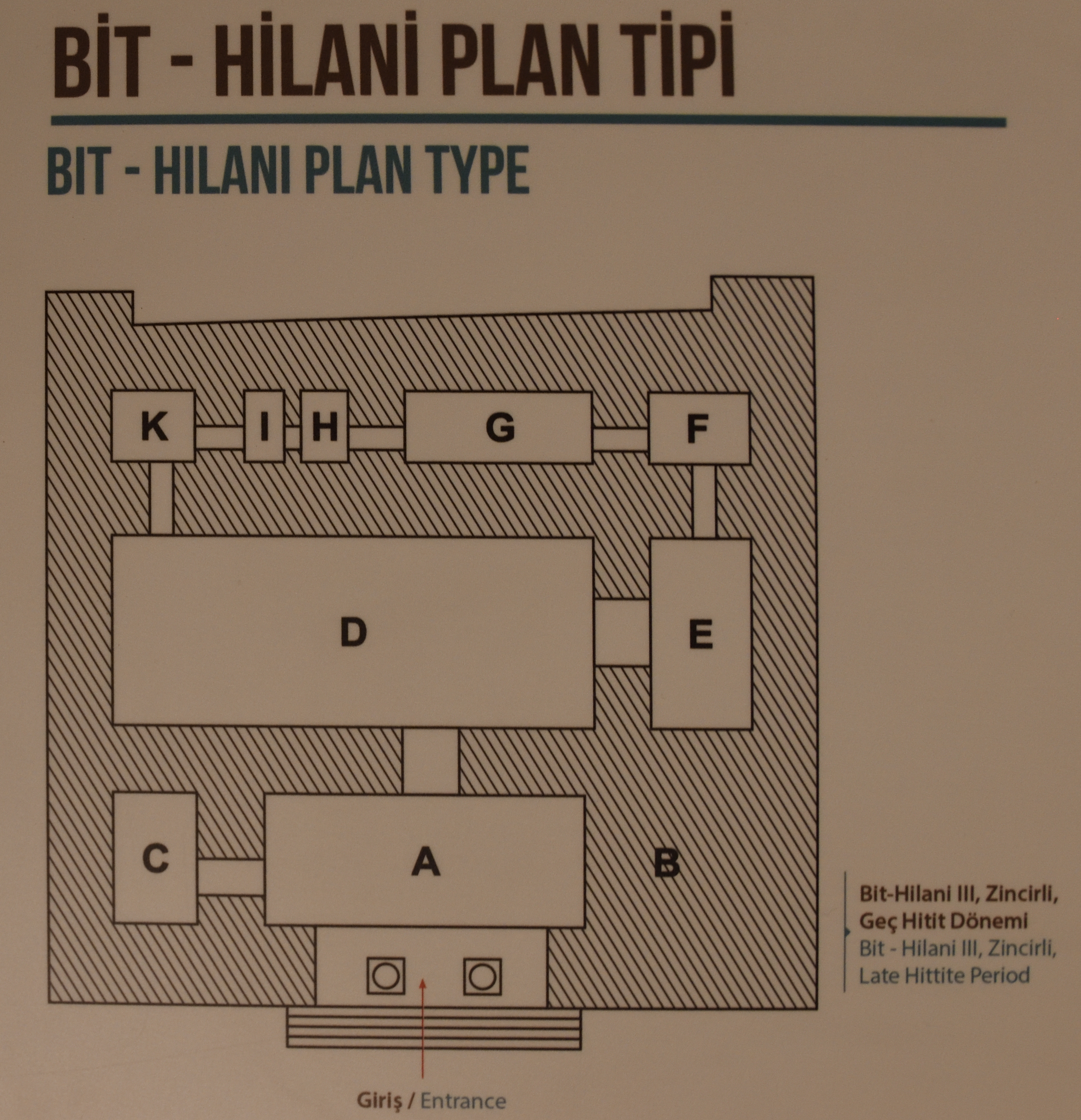
A building plan of a bit hilani type temple at Zinjirli, Turkey. Late Hittite period. Gaziantep Archaeology museum

A Bit-hilani (Akkadian: Bīt-Ḫilāni, meaning 'house of pillars') is an ancient architectural type of palace. It seems to have become popular at the end of the tenth and during the ninth century BCE during the early Iron Age in northern Syria although it may have originated as early as the Bronze Age. Contemporary records call it a Hittite-style palace, probably after the Neo-Hittite kingdoms of northern Syria. This building type has also spread to the Southern Levant, where it has been widely used.

== Description ==
The major feature for a visitor would have been the monumental entrance loggia or portico with columns flanked by large massive parts of the building and approached by a broad but relatively low flight of steps. On one side a stairway to the upper parts would reside in one of these block like structures. Straight ahead one would enter the great hall, where one would have to turn by 90° to see the throne in the far end of the hall. The overall plan of the building would be rectangular with the large hall in the middle surrounded on all sides by the other much narrower rooms.

== Origin and architectural legacy ==
This type of design with a large central space surrounded by a double wall with smaller rooms taking up the space within the walls may be based on designs first used in the late Ubaid period in southern Mesopotamia such as the Ubaid house. Pillared porticos as gates or grand entrances were used by several cultures of the Bronze Age around the eastern Mediterranean sea. The examples of the Hittites and the Myceneans may be the best known. Through the megarons and propylaea of the mycenaean palaces the style may have lived into classical Greek designs. The iron age hilani of the Levant, may well be the combination of the old broad-room concept with a Hittite-style portico. In recent traditional architecture it may have a late resemblance in the design of the liwan house.

== Individual examples ==
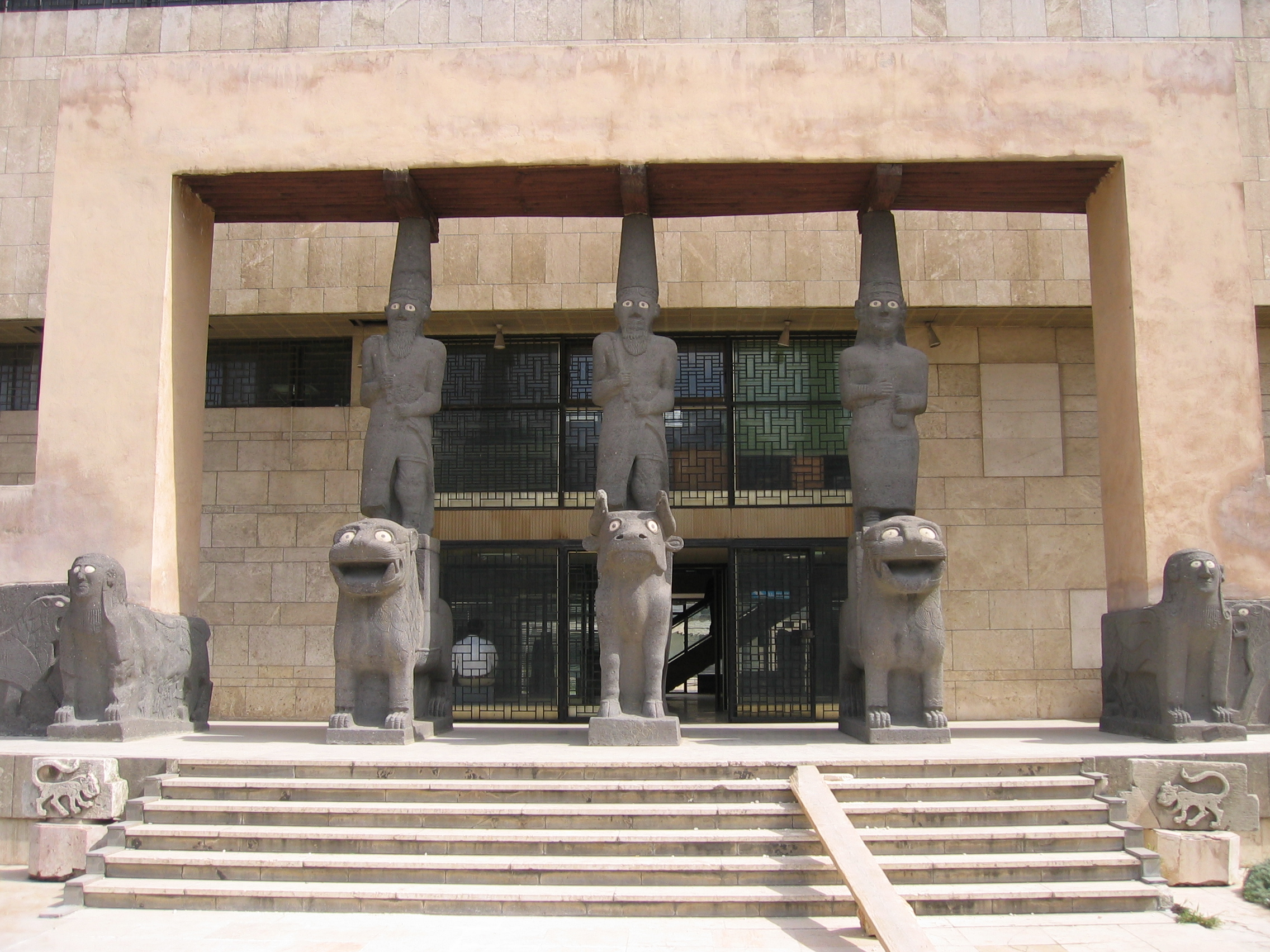
Entrance of the National Museum Aleppo, a reconstruction of the entrance to Kapara's palace at Tell Halaf

The oldest excavated building described as Hilani by its excavator Sir Leonard Woolley is a palace in level IV at Alalakh dated to the 15th century BCE. The palace is thought to have been built by Niqmepa, a son of Idrimi of the royal family of the Amorite state of Yamhad based in Halab.

A building at the citadel (Büyükkale) of the Hittite capital Hattusa may also have been of the hilani type. As most of the structures on the citadel underwent considerable rebuilding during the reign of Tudhaliya IV (c. 1237–1209 BCE), it is usually dated to the 13th century BCE.

Kapara, king of the Hittite kingdom of Bit Bahiani in the 10th or 9th century BCE, built himself a palace of this style in his capital at Guzana (Tell Halaf). The palace, with a rich decoration of statues and relief orthostats, was excavated by Max von Oppenheim in 1911. Some of the finds were taken to Berlin, much of them destroyed when von Oppenheim's private museum was hit during a bombing raid in November 1943 and recently partially reconstructed from the preserved pieces. The National Museum of Aleppo has reconstructed the pillared portico in front of its entrance.

Other buildings of this type have been excavated, among others at Tell Tayinat, Qatna, Sam'al, Sakçagözü, Carchemish, Tell Sheikh Hamad, maybe Kinet Höyük and at Emar.

When claiming to have built in the style of a hilani, most builders probably referred to the pillared portico with antechamber such as:

Sargon II, King of Assyria 722–705 BCE, at his new city of Dur-Sharrukin, begun in 713 BCE. An isolated building of which not much is known yet has been located in the western corner of the palace terrace. It may be a candidate for the building he mentions in his founding text.

"A portico, patterned after the Hittite palace, which in the language of Amurru they call a bit-hilani, I built in front of the palaces' gates."

Sennacherib, King of Assyria (704–681 BC), claims to have done some building in Niniveh in the style of a bit-hilani. Nothing similar to a hilani has to date been identified without doubt at his palace, known today as the South-West Palace in Niniveh, finished in 694 BCE. The building in question may not have been found yet.
