= Kapara =

Aramean king

King of Bit Bahiani

King Kapara (also Gabara) was an Aramean king of Bit Bahiani, one of the Post-Hittite states, centered in Guzana (modern Tell Halaf, in northeastern Syria). He ruled sometime in the 10th or 9th century BCE, according to some estimations ca. 950-875 BCE. He built Bit-hilani, a monumental palace in Post-Hittite style, discovered by Max von Oppenheim in 1911, with a rich decoration of statues and relief orthostats.

In 894 BC, the Assyrian king Adad-nirari II recorded the site in his archives as a tributary Aramaean city-state. In 808 BC the city and its surrounding area was reduced to a province of the Neo-Assyrian Empire.

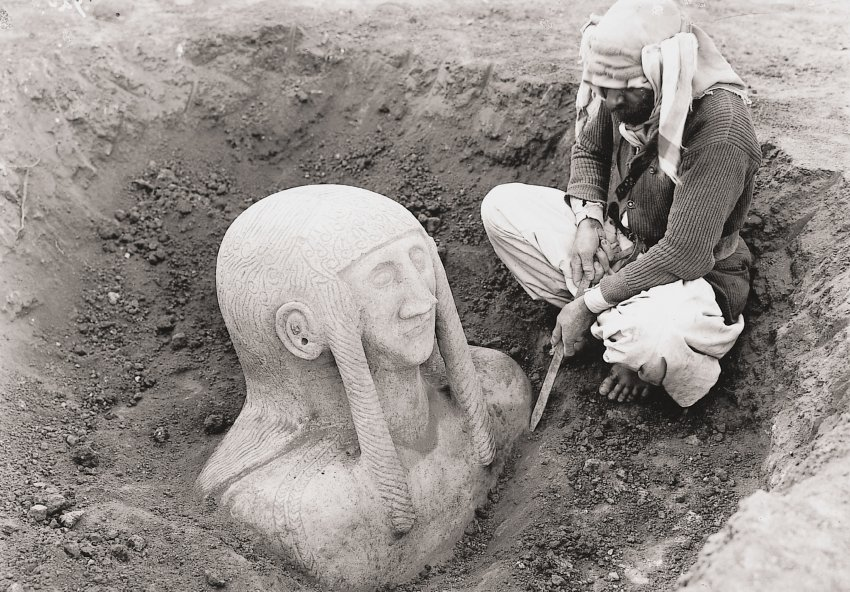
Excavations in Tell Halaf, 1912

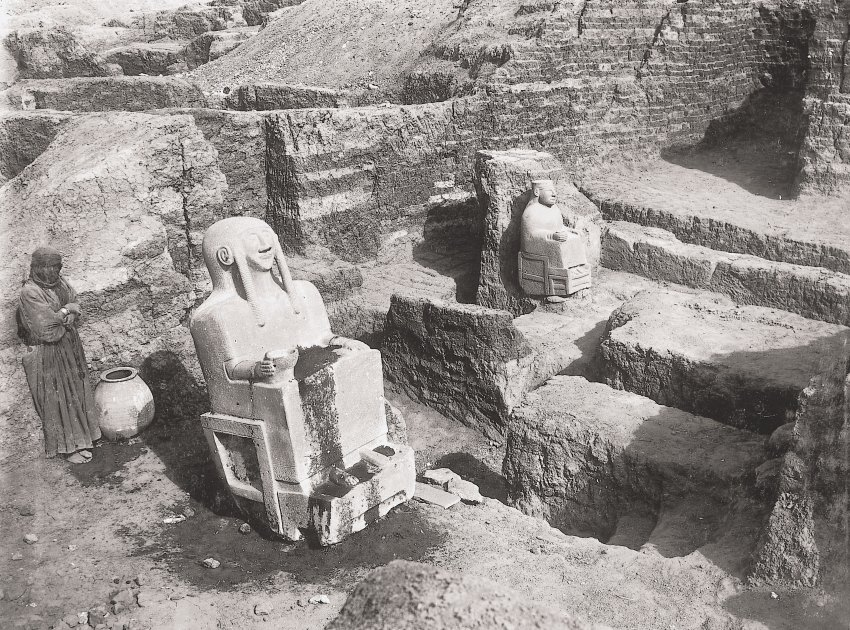
Excavations in Tell Halaf, 1913

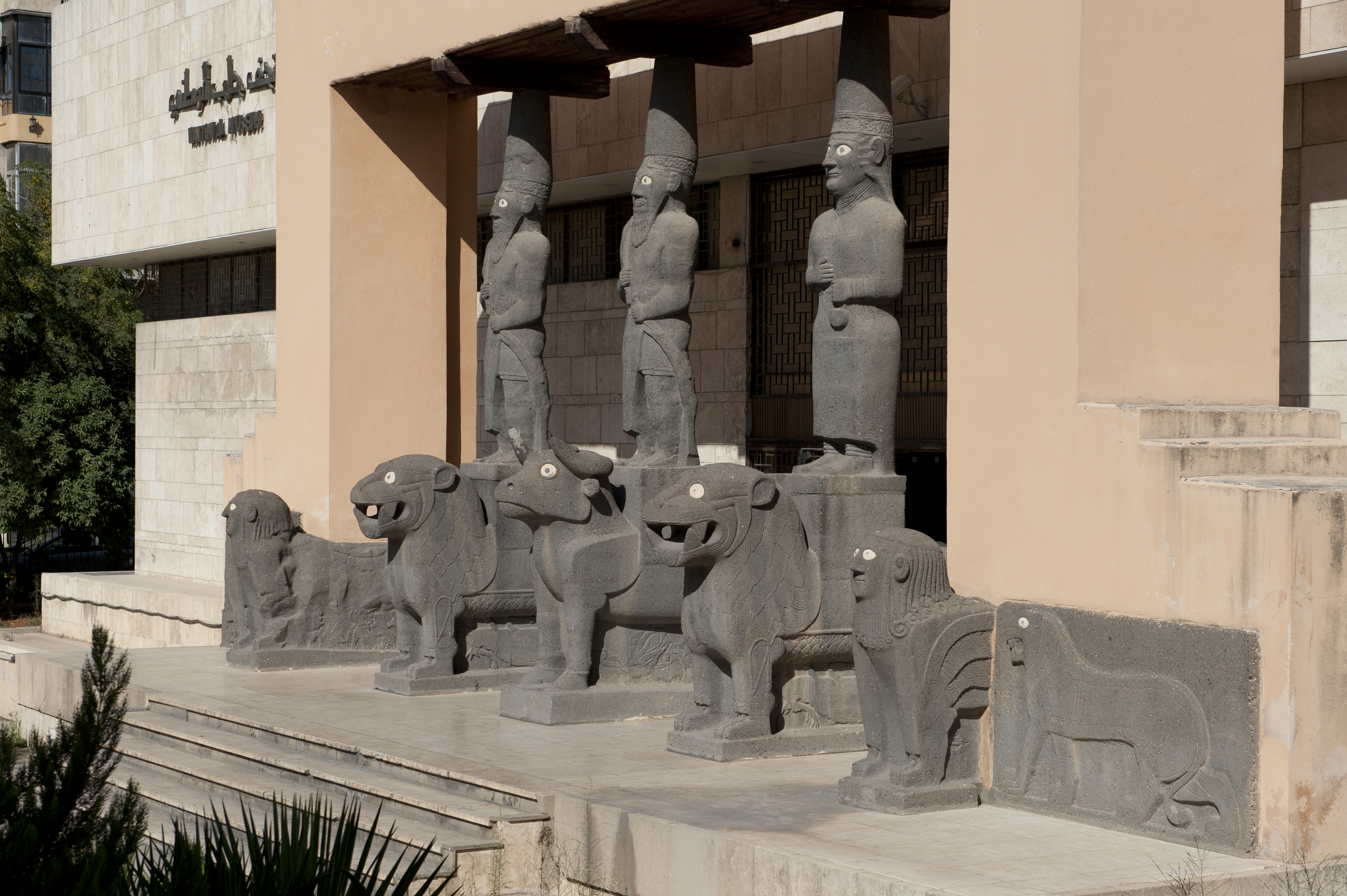
A replica of the entrance to the palace of king Kapara at the National Museum of Aleppo

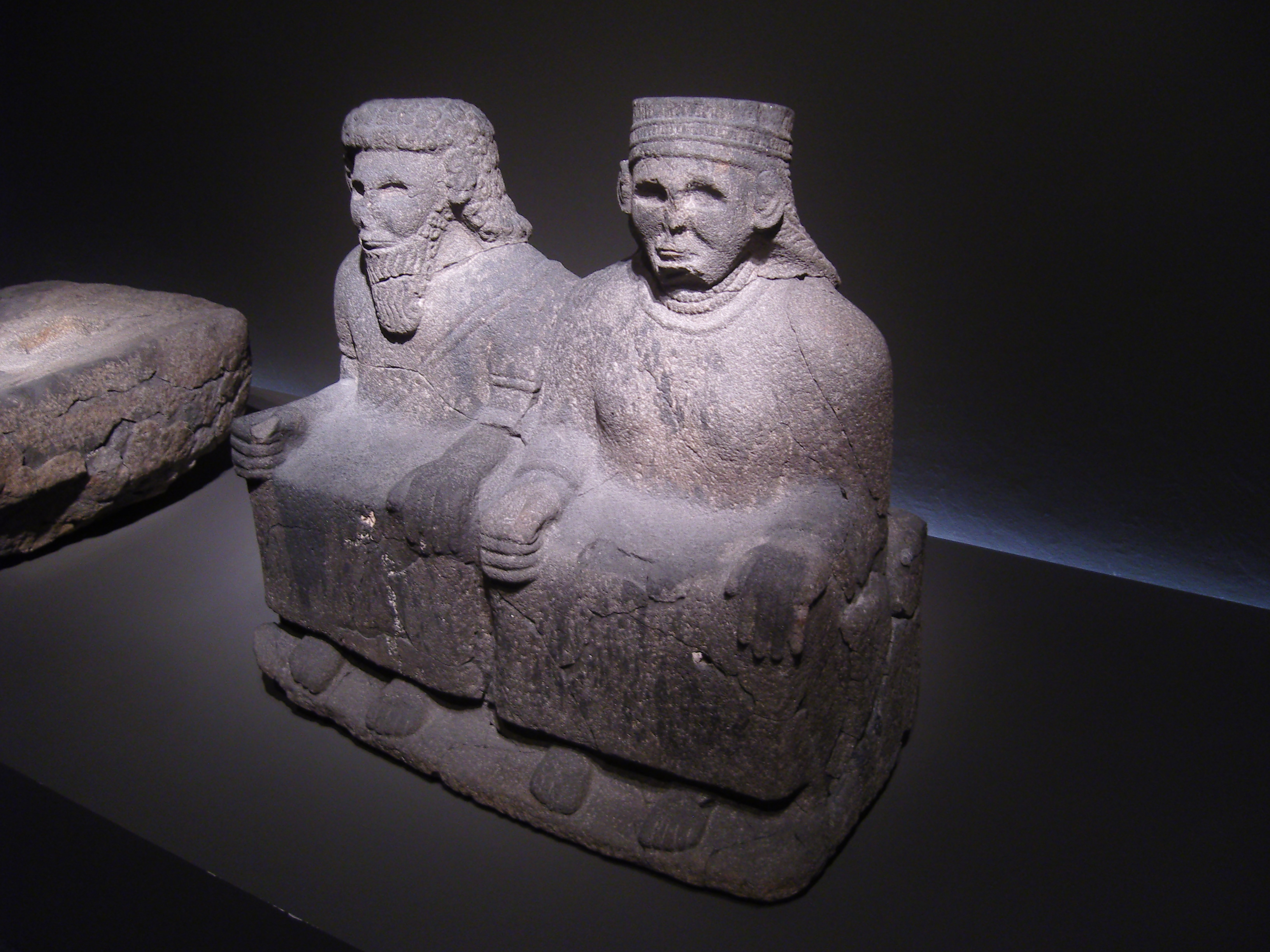
A stele depicting of Hadad and Ishtar

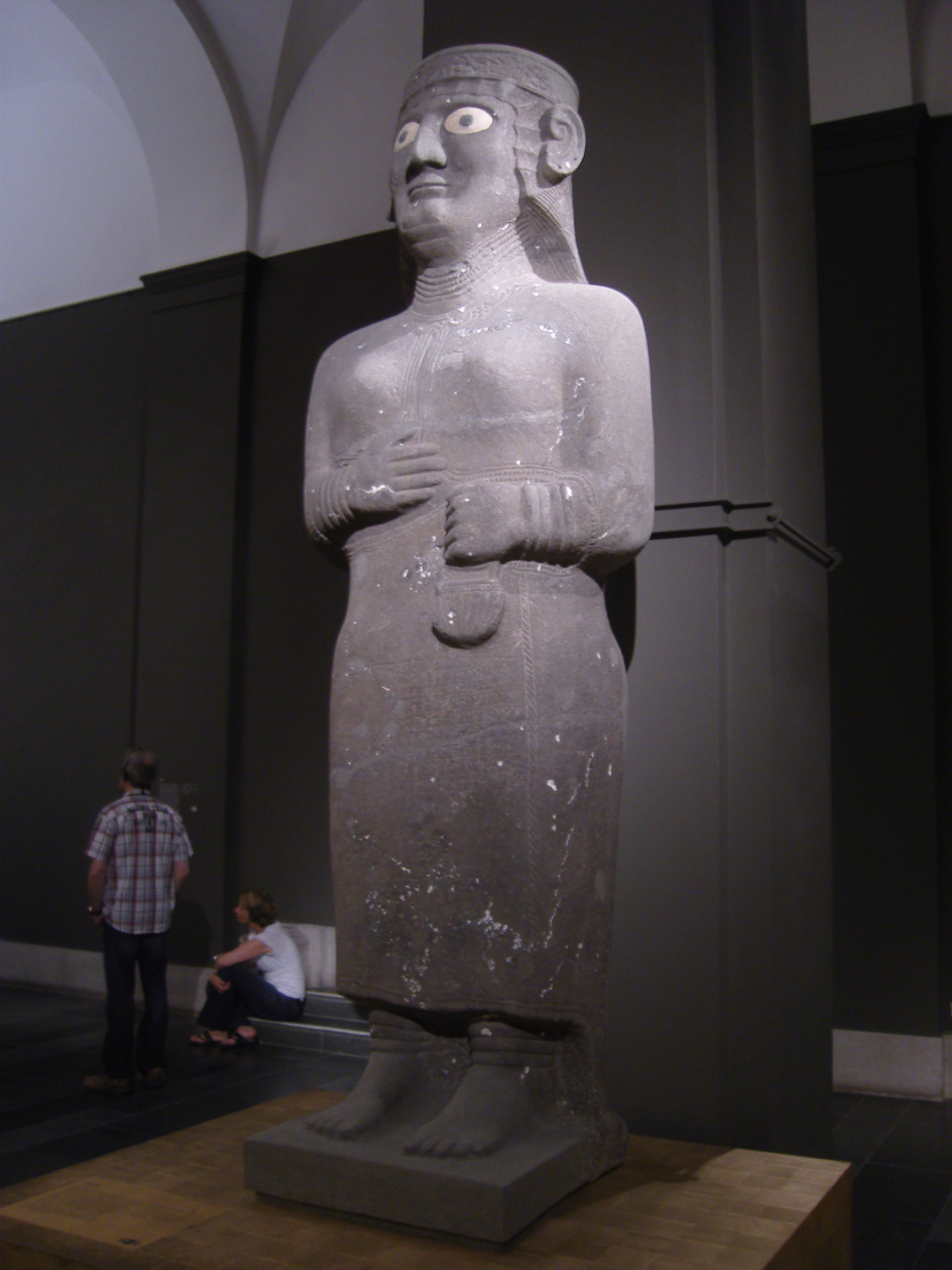
An Aramean goddess

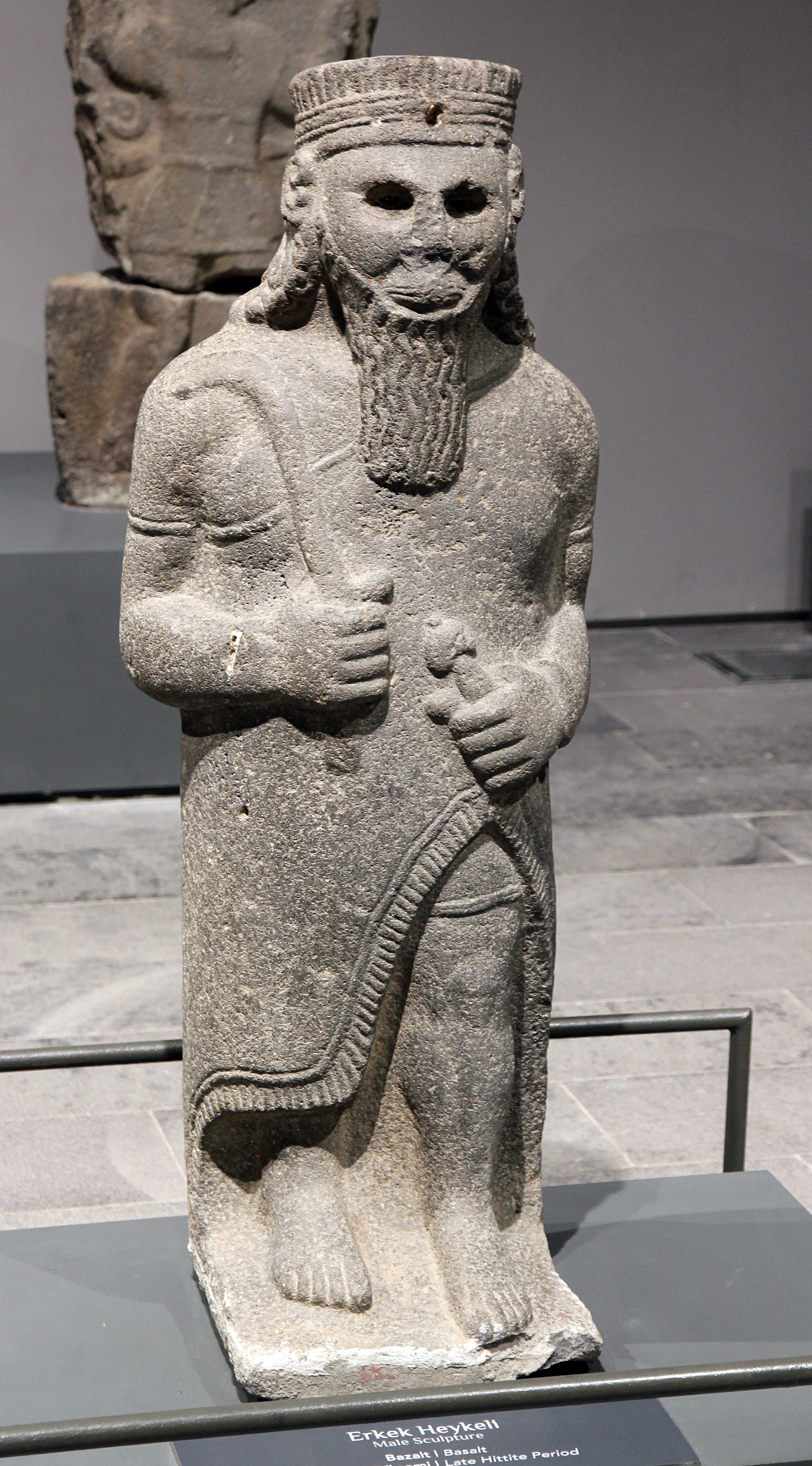
An Aramean god

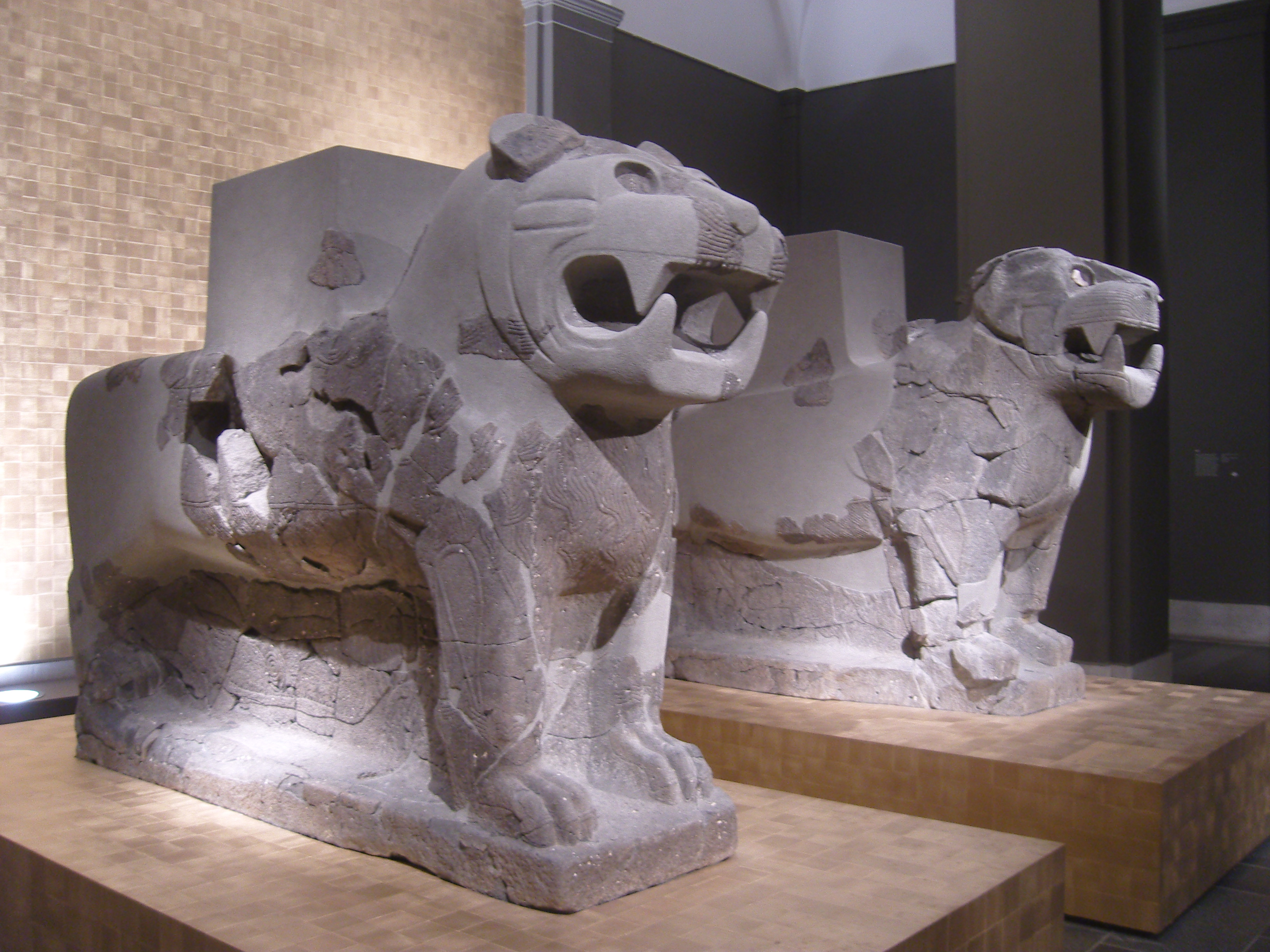
A stele depicting two guardian lions

== Sources ==
- Bryce, Trevor R. (2012). The World of The Neo-Hittite Kingdoms: A Political and Military History. New York: Oxford University Press. ISBN 978-0-19-150502-7.
- Gzella, Holger (2015). A Cultural History of Aramaic: From the Beginnings to the Advent of Islam. Leiden-Boston: Brill. ISBN 9789004285101.
- Lipiński, Edward (2000). The Aramaeans: Their Ancient History, Culture, Religion. Leuven: Peeters Publishers. ISBN 9789042908598.
- Sader, Hélène (2010). "The Aramaeans of Syria: Some Considerations on their Origin and Material Culture". The Books of Kings: Sources, Composition, Historiography and Reception. Leiden-Boston: Brill. pp. 273–300. ISBN 978-9004177291.
- Younger, Kenneth Lawson (2016). A Political History of the Arameans: From Their Origins to the End of Their Polities. Atlanta: SBL Press. ISBN 9781628370843.
