= Max von Oppenheim =

German lawyer, diplomat, ancient historian, and archaeologist (1860–1946)

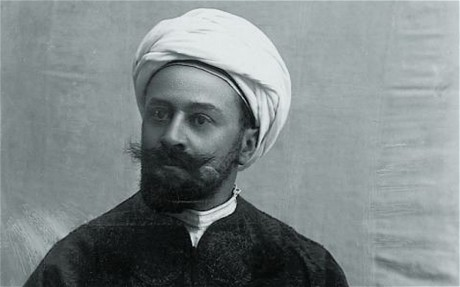
- circa 1917
- Born: Max von Oppenheim; 15 July 1860; Cologne, Kingdom of Prussia
- Died: 17 November 1946 (aged 86); Landshut, Allied-occupied Germany
- Education: University of Strasbourg, University of Göttingen

Signature
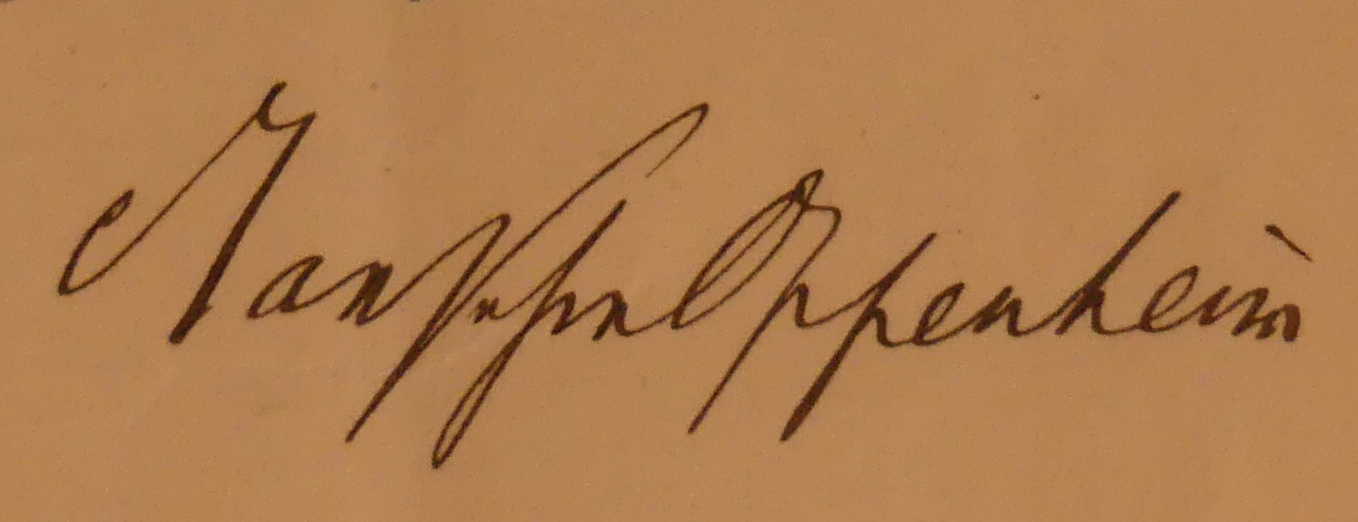

Baron Max von Oppenheim (15 July 1860 – 17 November 1946) was a German lawyer, diplomat, ancient historian, pan-Islamist and archaeologist. He was a member of the Oppenheim banking dynasty. Abandoning his career in diplomacy, he discovered the site of Tell Halaf in 1899 and conducted excavations there in 1911–13 and again in 1927–29. Bringing many of his finds to Berlin, he exhibited them in a private museum (The Tell Halaf Museum) in 1931. This was destroyed by Allied bombing in World War II; however, most of the findings were recently restored and have been exhibited again at Berlin and Bonn.

Oppenheim was a controversial figure before and during World War I because he was considered a spy by the French and British. In fact, he engaged in anti-Allied propaganda, which was aimed at stirring up the Muslim populations of the Allied-controlled territories against their colonial masters.

== Early life ==
Max Oppenheim was born on 15 July 1860 in Cologne as the son of Albert Oppenheim and Pauline Engels. Albert Oppenheim, a member of the Jewish Oppenheim family of bankers, had converted to Catholicism in 1858 to marry Catholic Pauline Engels, from an established Cologne merchant family. In 1867, Max's grandfather, Simon, was awarded the title of Freiherr (Baron) in Austria-Hungary. As the title was also valid in Prussia, the family now styled itself "von Oppenheim".

Max grew up as one of five siblings and from an early age he was exposed to art, as his father was an avid collector and patron of the arts. Although his father wanted him to work in the banking house of Sal. Oppenheim, Max had other ideas. According to his unpublished memoirs, it was a Christmas gift of The Thousand and One Nights that first gave rise to his interest in the East. Max attended school at Cologne from 1866 to 1879, finishing with the Abitur at the Apostelgymnasium. He then followed the wish of his father and began to study law at the University of Strasbourg. However, rather than study, he spent most of time at the Studentenverbindung "Palatia". He then transferred to Berlin University but his lack of academic progress caused his father to recall him to Cologne where he finished his 1. Staatsexamen and the doctoral exam in 1883. During his time as Referendar he learned Arabic and began to collect Oriental art. At that time, Max also did his military service in the 15th Uhlan regiment (lancers). He finished his Referendariat in 1891 by passing the exam as Assessor.

== Travel in the East and diplomatic service ==
In 1892, Oppenheim travelled to Spain, the Maghreb and on to Cairo where he stayed for seven months, studying Arabic and Islam. Unusually, he moved out of a European-style hotel to live in a quarter inhabited by locals. In 1893–94, Oppenheim then travelled from Cairo through the Syrian desert and Mesopotamia to Basra. He passed through areas not visited by any European explorer before him and developed a keen interest in the Bedouins. Returning by way of India and Deutsch Ostafrika to Germany, in 1895 Max von Oppenheim wrote his two-volume travelogue Vom Mittelmeer zum Persischen Golf, which made him famous on publication in 1899/1900. T. E. Lawrence, whom Oppenheim later met at Carchemish in 1912, called Oppenheim's work "the best book on the area I know". In 1895, Oppenheim visited Constantinople and was received for an audience by Sultan Abdul Hamid II, discussing Panislamism.

Interested in politics and diplomacy, Oppenheim tried to join the diplomatic corps but he was first rejected by Herbert von Bismarck and then Auswärtiges Amt (Foreign Office) due to the Jewish background of his father. Using well-connected friends — including Paul Graf von Hatzfeldt — Oppenheim succeeded in being accepted as an attaché (which did not bestow diplomatic status) at the German General Consulate in Cairo. In June 1896, he arrived in Cairo which was to be his home for the next thirteen years. Not issued with any specific instructions, he made use of his freedom to engage in freelance activities, sending reports of his impressions to his superiors in Berlin (over the years totaling around 500). However, most of his messages were simply filed without comment, only rarely distributed more widely within the diplomatic service. Oppenheim was more successful in establishing a network of upper class acquaintances in Cairo, both European and local.

This activity and his views in support of the German government's colonial ambitions caused considerable mistrust among the British in Egypt, worried about German designs on the country (which had become a de facto protectorate in 1882), the Suez Canal and the lifeline to their possessions in India. The British press repeatedly agitated against him, even styling him a "master spy of the Kaiser". For example, when tensions were later heightened by the Aqaba border crisis,1906, British and French papers accused Oppenheim of acting in ways to incite pan-Islamic jihadi massacres of Europeans and of plotting with anti-French Algerian, and anti-Italian Tripolitan, rebels.

On one of several trips he made while stationed at Cairo, in 1899 Oppenheim travelled via Aleppo to Damascus and northern Mesopotamia on behalf of Deutsche Bank, working on establishing a route for the Baghdad Railway. On 19 November, he discovered the archaeological site of Tell Halaf, following up on tales told to him by local villagers of stone idols buried beneath the sand. Within three days, several significant pieces of statuary were uncovered, including the so-called "Sitting Goddess". A test pit uncovered the entrance to the "Western Palace". Since he had no legal permit to excavate, Oppenheim had the statues he found reburied and moved on. Deutsche Bank was not satisfied with his work on the railway and he was subsequently dismissed as an advisor. He continued to work in Cairo as a diplomat until 1910 when he was dismissed from the diplomatic service with the rank of Ministerresident on 1 November.

== Excavations at Tell-Halaf ==
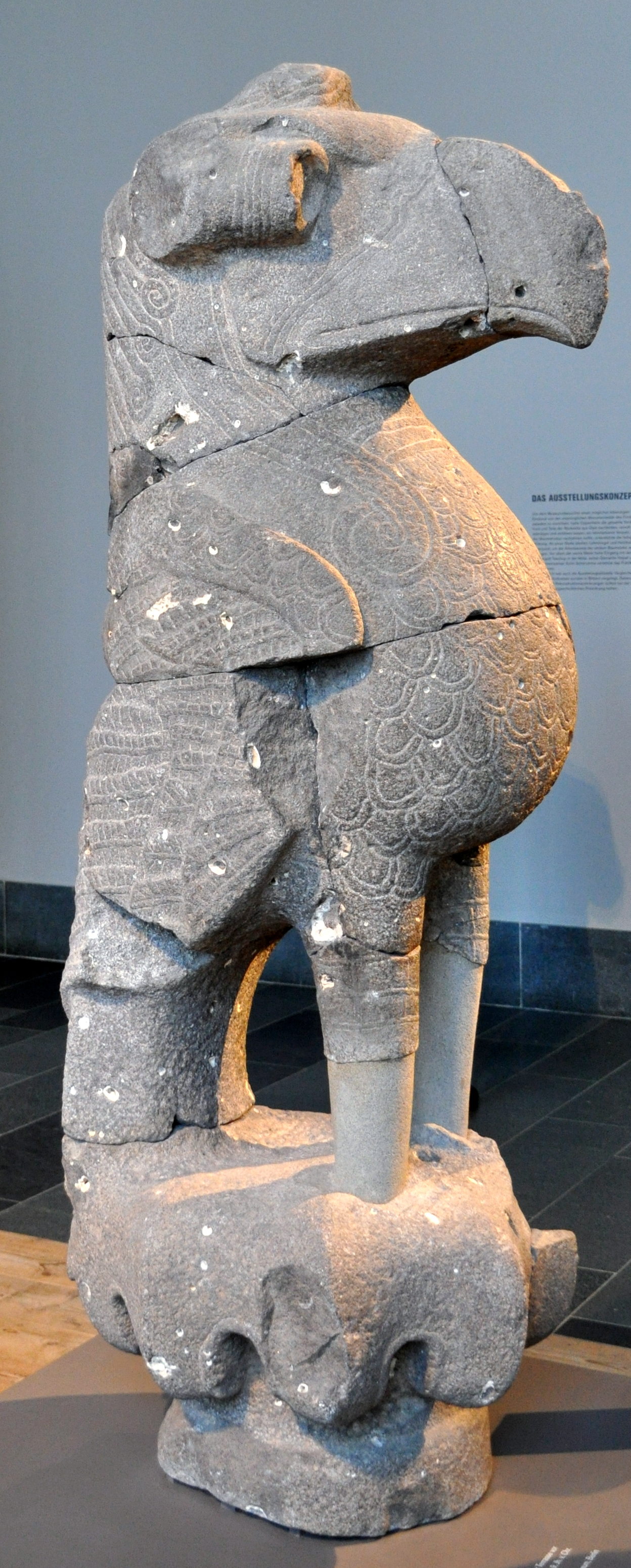
Reconstructed bird statue found at Tell Halaf (184 by 70 by 70 cm)

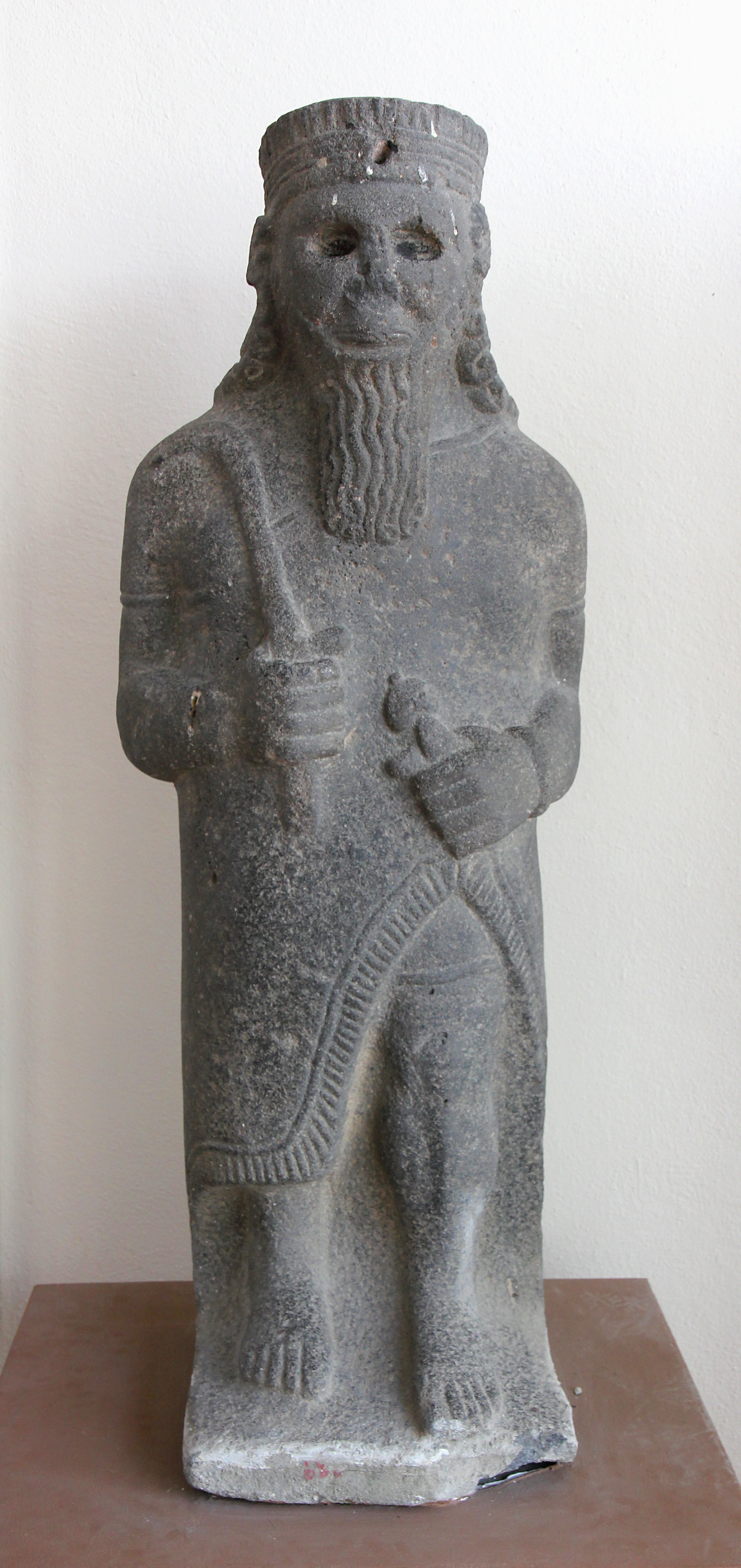
Statue of a male from the cult room at Tell Halaf, today at the Adana Museum, Turkey

Relief of a six-winged genius from the palace at Tell Halaf, confiscated by the US government in 1943, today at the Walters Art Museum, Baltimore

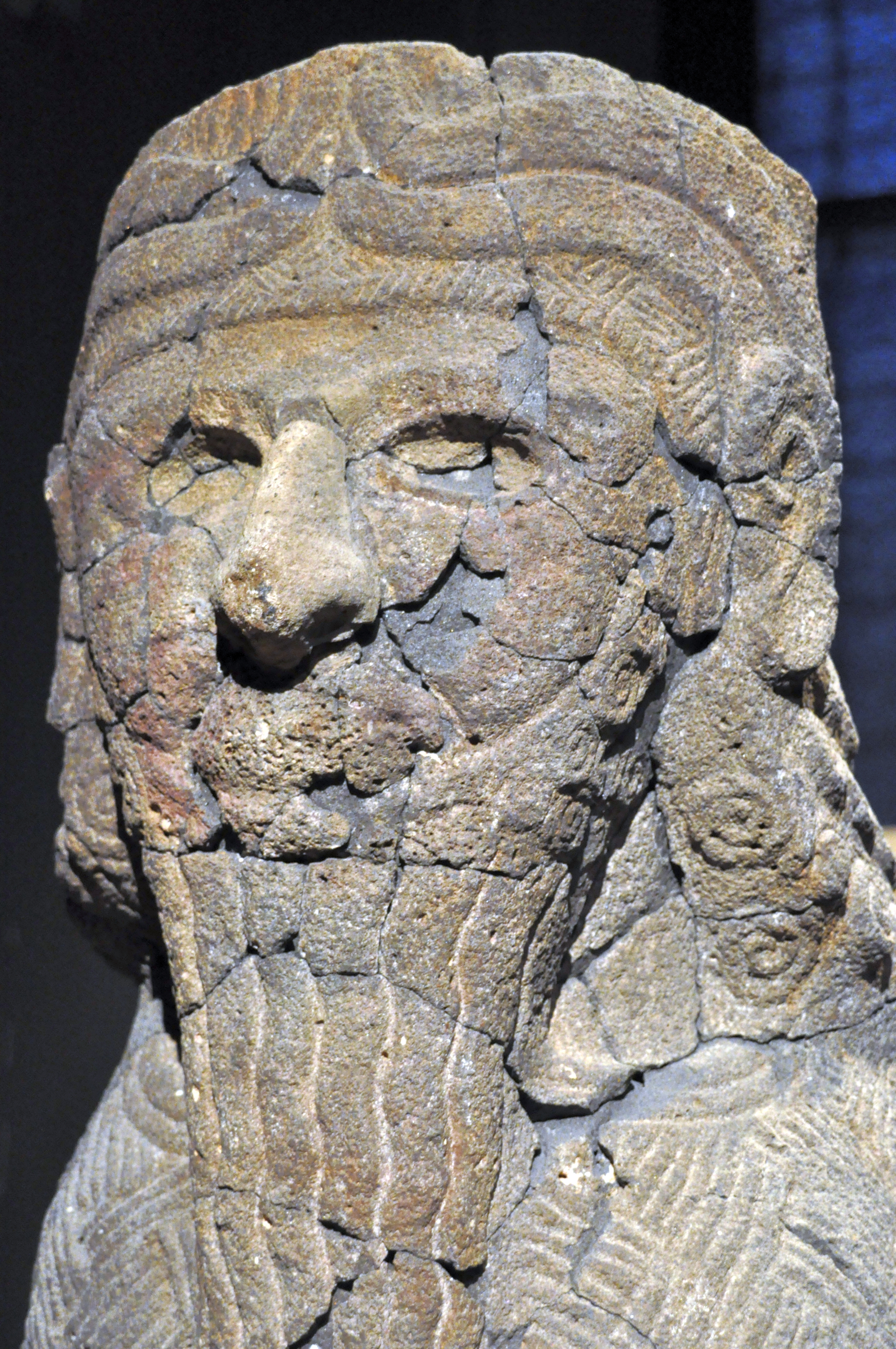
Scorpion-birdman from the Scorpion Gate at the Western Palace of Tell Halaf, damaged by fire in 1943 and restored

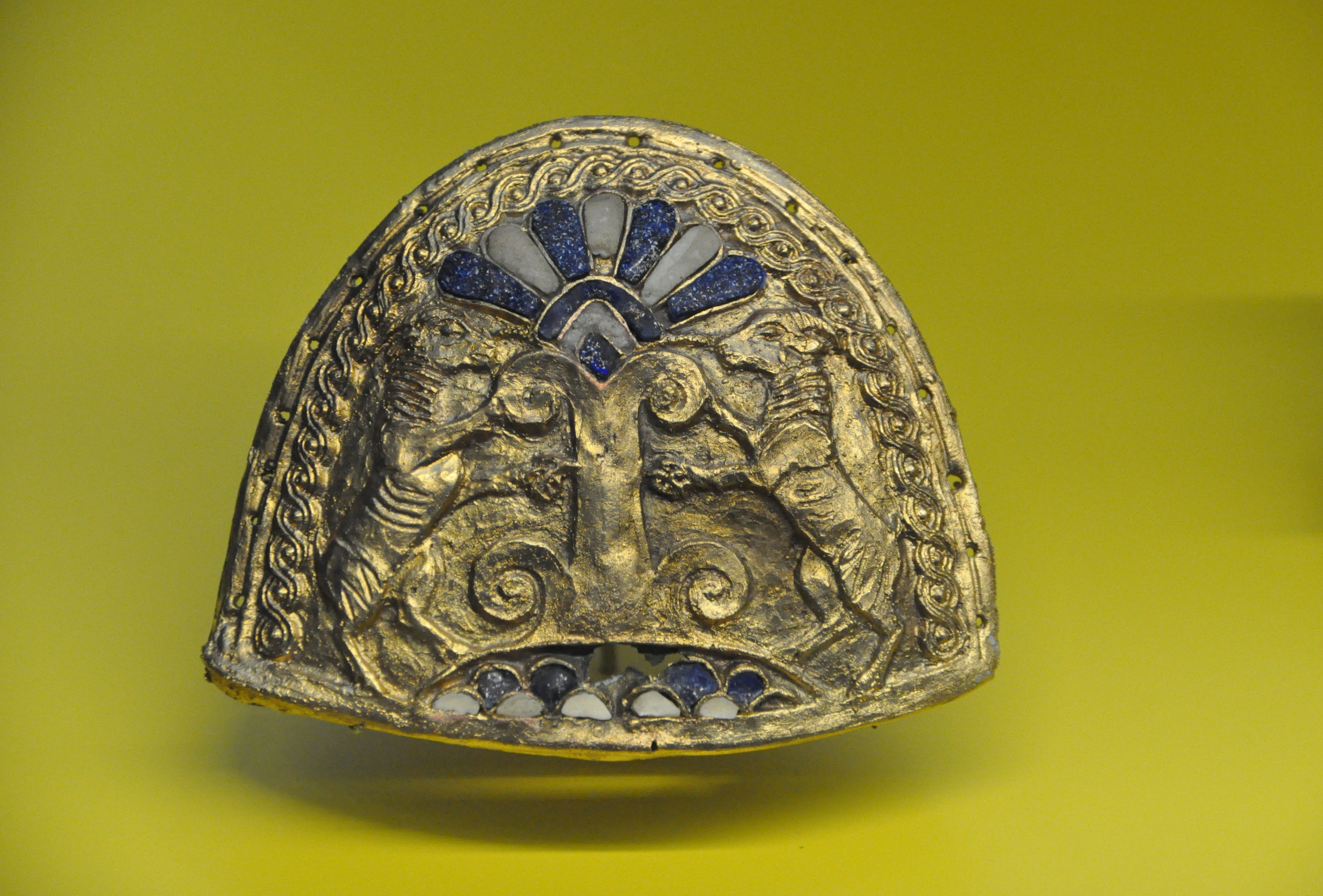
Replica of a gold clothing ornament found at Tell Halaf

According to noted archaeologist Ernst Herzfeld, he had urged Oppenheim in 1907 to excavate Tell Halaf and they made some initial plans towards this goal at that time. In August 1910, Herzfeld wrote a letter calling on Oppenheim to explore the site and had it circulated to several leading archaeologists like Theodor Noldeke or Ignaz Goldziher to sign. Armed with this letter, Max von Oppenheim was now able to ask for his dismissal from the service (which he did on 24 October 1910) while being able to call on financing from his father for the excavation.

With a team of five archaeologists, and additionally recruiting more than 500 residents to assist with the excavations, Oppenheim planned a digging campaign that began on 5 August 1911. Substantial equipment was imported, including a small steam train. The costs totaled around 750,000 Mark and were covered by von Oppenheim's father. On arrival, the archaeologists discovered that since 1899 locals had uncovered some of the findings and heavily damaged them - in part out of superstition, in part to gain valuable building material.

During the excavations Oppenheim found the ruins of the Aramaean town of Guzana (or Gozan), which flourished at the turn of the 2nd/1st millennium BC. Significant finds included the large statues and reliefs of the so-called "Western Palace" built by King Kapara, as well as a cult room and tombs. After a revolt, the Aramaean palace had been destroyed and Guzana became an Assyrian province. Some of the statuary was found reused in buildings from the Hellenistic period. In addition, they discovered Neolithic pottery from around 6,000 to 5,000 BC of a type which became known as Halaf culture after the site where it was first found. At the time, this was the oldest painted pottery ever found (together with those discovered at Samarra by Herzfeld). A statue of a seated figure referred to as "Venus" as well as orthostats which decorated the exterior of the palace were also found, they were made out of basalt and dated back to the Neo-Hittite period.

In 1913, Oppenheim also discovered the reliefs at the Djebelet el-Beda before deciding to return temporarily to Germany. The finds of Tell Halaf were left at the building he and his team had inhabited during the dig. Most of them were securely packaged and stored.

== First World War ==
The outbreak of World War I prevented him from returning, however. As an expert on the East, the Foreign Office asked him to summarise the many different strategic ideas floating around in the ministry. The result was his Denkschrift betreffend die Revolutionierung der islamischen Gebiete unserer Feinde ("Memorandum on revolutionizing the Islamic territories of our enemies") of October 1914. The memo argued for enlisting the Sultan to call on the world's Muslims to engage in a Holy War against the colonial powers, France and Great Britain. To develop the necessary propaganda, the Nachrichtenstelle für den Orient (Intelligence Bureau for the East) was established in Berlin. Oppenheim became its head.

In November 1914, Sultan Mehmed V indeed called for a jihad against the enemies of the Ottoman Empire. In 1915, Oppenheim was sent to the German embassy at Constantinople to disseminate propaganda material in the Ottoman Empire. On one of several trips he made at the time, he met Prince Faisal in early 1915, trying to win him for the German side, unaware that Faisal's father, Hussein was negotiating with the British almost simultaneously. Whilst their attempt to incite an Arab rebellion was eventually successful, Oppenheim failed.

In late 1915, British High Commissioner in Cairo Henry McMahon claimed in a report that Oppenheim had been making speeches in mosques approving of the massacre of Armenians initiated by the Young Turk government earlier that year.

Oppenheim was credited with being the one who came up with the dual approach to fighting the British and French: through regular troops and by encouraging uprisings by the masses. Some among the Arabs reportedly referred to Oppenheim as Abu Jihad ("Father of Holy War").

In 1917, Oppenheim returned to Berlin and began to work on the publication of his excavation results.

== Weimar Republic and second excavation at Tell Halaf ==
With Germany initially not a member of the League of Nations, there was no way for Oppenheim to resume his excavations. He decided to become a private scholar. In 1922, Oppenheim founded the Orient-Forschungsinstitut in Berlin. At the institute young scholars from various disciplines worked together to advance the study of Middle Eastern culture and history. In the inflation of 1923 Oppenheim lost most of his financial wealth. From then on, he was forced to rely on loans and support from friends and relatives.

In 1926, Germany joined the League of Nations. Preparing for new excavations, in 1927 Oppenheim again travelled to Tell Halaf. Artillery fire exchanged between Ottoman and French troops in the final days of the war had severely damaged the building and the archaeological findings had to be dug out of the rubble. Once again, it was found that the locals had damaged some of the stone workings. Since he had made plaster casts during the original excavation, Oppenheim was able to repair most of the damage done to the statues and orthostat reliefs. He managed to achieve a generous division of his previous finds with the authorities of the French Mandate. His share (about two-thirds of the total) was transported to Berlin, the rest was brought to Aleppo, where Oppenheim installed a museum that became the nucleus of today's National Museum.

In 1929, he resumed excavations and the new findings were divided. That year, Oppenheim also founded the Max-von-Oppenheim-Stiftung to ensure work on his findings continued after his death.

== Foundation of the Tell Halaf Museum and later life ==
Attempts to have his findings exhibited at the newly constructed Pergamon Museum failed, as the museum refused to agree to Oppenheim's financial demands. He thus opened his own private "Tell Halaf Museum" in an industrial complex in Berlin-Charlottenburg in July 1930. The museum's concept of presenting the exhibits is considered quite modern even by today's standards. It was subsequently visited and remarked upon by archaeologist Max Mallowan, his wife Agatha Christie and Samuel Beckett. The 1936 Baedeker guidebook on Berlin recommended a visit.

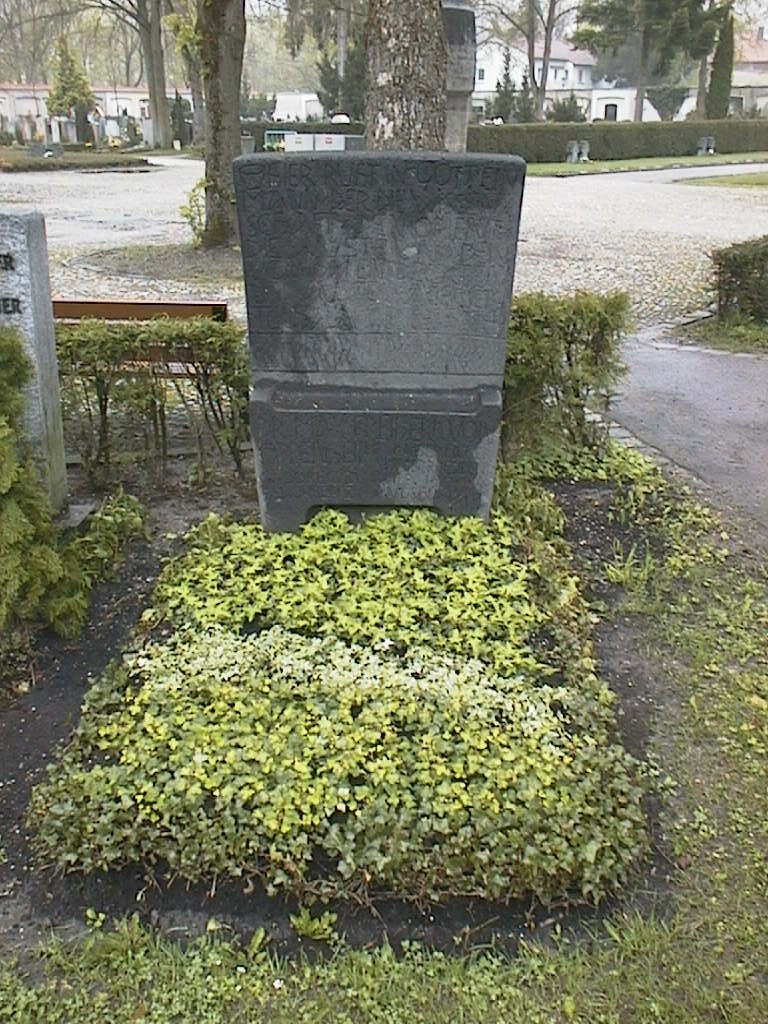
Max von Oppenheim grave in Landshut, Landshuter Stadtkreis Bavaria (Bayern), Germany

After the Nazis took power in 1933, Oppenheim's Jewish background became a potential threat. Probably protected by old acquaintances in the scientific community, he was able to continue with his scholarly work. Apparently, this involved some efforts to fit into the intellectual climate of the time. According to historian Sean McMeekin: "In a speech before Nazi dignitaries, he went so far as to flatly ascribe his statues to the 'Aryan' culture, and he even received support from the Nazi government." Oppenheim once again wrote a memorandum on Middle Eastern strategic policies. In 1939, he once more travelled to Syria for excavations, coming within sight of Tell Halaf. However, the French authorities refused to award him a permit to dig and he had to depart. With debts of 2 million Reichsmark, Oppenheim was in dire financial trouble. He unsuccessfully tried to sell some of his finds in New York and again negotiated with the German government about the purchase of the Tell Halaf artefacts. While these negotiations continued, the museum was hit by an Allied phosphorus bomb in November 1943. It burnt down completely, all wooden and limestone exhibits were destroyed. Those made from basalt were exposed to a thermal shock during attempts to fight the fire and severely damaged. Many statues and reliefs burst into dozens of pieces. Although the Vorderasiatisches Museum Berlin took care of the remains, months passed before all of the pieces had been recovered and they were further damaged by frost and summer heat.

Artefacts which Oppenheim had left in storage in New York (including orthostats from Tell Halaf) after unsuccessful attempts to sell them were managed under the Office of Alien Property Custodian, which in 1943 mandated that Oppenheim's property be treated as under the control of the United States.

A bombing raid in 1943 also destroyed Oppenheim's apartment in Berlin and with it much of his library and art collection. He then moved to Dresden, where he lived through the firebombing of February 1945. Having lost virtually all his possessions, Oppenheim moved to Schloss Ammerland in Bavaria, where he stayed with his sister. He died on 15 November 1946 at the age of 86, in Landshut, and is buried there.

Oppenheim's grave is a basalt replica of the bottom half of the seated woman statue which he adored. It is evident he admired this statue, as Agatha Christie in her memoirs recalls Oppenheim looking up at this statue whilst on a tour of The Tell Halaf Museum in Berlin and exclaiming, "Ah my beautiful Venus."

== Legacy ==
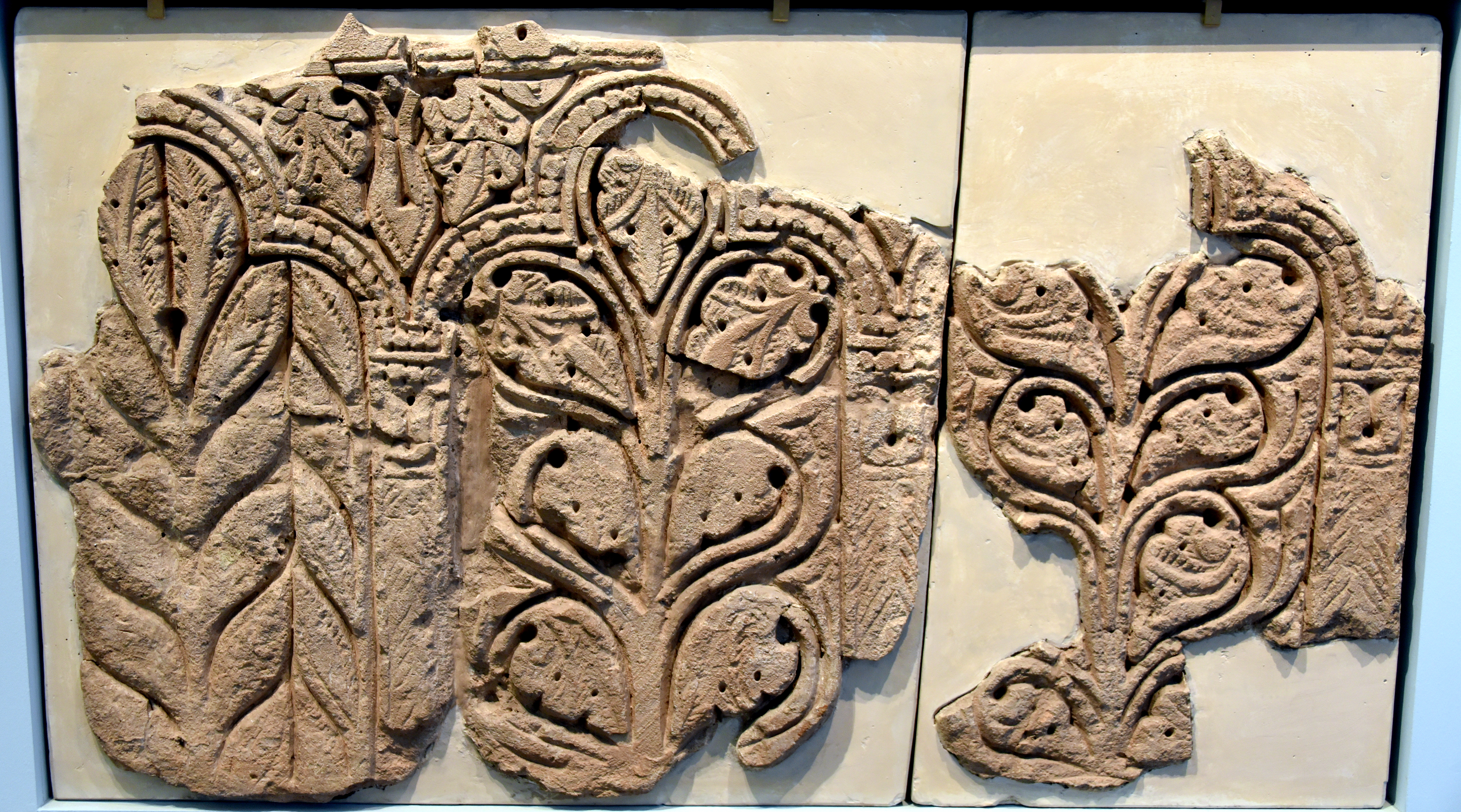
Carved stucco wall from Kharab Sayyar in northern Syria. Excavated by Oppenheim in 1913, 9th-10th century CE. Museum für Islamische Kunst, Berlin

Stored in the cellars of the Pergamon Museum during the period of communist rule under the GDR, the remains were left untouched. After reunification, the Masterplan Museumsinsel of 1999 brought up the idea of having the Western Palace front from Tell Halaf restored. With financial support from Sal. Oppenheim and the Deutsche Forschungsgemeinschaft the Vorderasiatisches Museum engaged in its largest-scale restoration project since the reconstruction of the Ishtar Gate. From 2001 to 2010, more than 30 sculptures were reconstructed out of around 27,000 fragments. They were exhibited at the Pergamon Museum in Berlin in 2011 and at the Bundeskunsthalle Bonn in 2014. The latter exhibition focused not just on the archaeological finds but also on the person of Max von Oppenheim, who has been called "the last of the great amateur archaeological explorers of the Near East". When the reconstruction of the Museumsinsel is completed around 2025, the Western Palace façade will be the entrance to the new Vorderasiatisches Museum.

== Publications ==
- Vom Mittelmeer zum persischen Golf durch den Haurän, die syrische Wüste und Mesopotamien, 2 vols., 1899/1900
- Rabeh und Tschadseegebiet, 1902
- Der Tell Halaf und die verschleierte Göttin. Leipzig: Hinrichs 1908.
- Die Revolutionierung der islamischen Gebiete unserer Feinde. 1914.
- Der Tell Halaf: Eine neue Kultur im ältesten Mesopotamien. F. A. Brockhaus, Leipzig 1931.
- Tell Halaf I, 1943 (with Hubert Schmidt)
- Tell Halaf II, 1950 (with R. Naumann)
- Die Beduinen vols I - IV (1939 - 1967)

== See also ==
- Syro-Hittite states
