= Bit Bahiani =

Coordinates: 36°50′N 40°04′E

- c. 1200 BC–808 BC
- Bit-Bahiani and other contemporary Aramean kingdoms in the 10th/9th century BC
- Capital: Guzana
- Common languages: Aramaic
- Religion: Ancient Levantine Religion
- Historical era: Iron Age
  - Established: c. 1200 BC
  - Disestablished: 808 BC
Succeeded by
Neo-Assyrian Empire
- Today part of: Syria; Iraq; Turkey

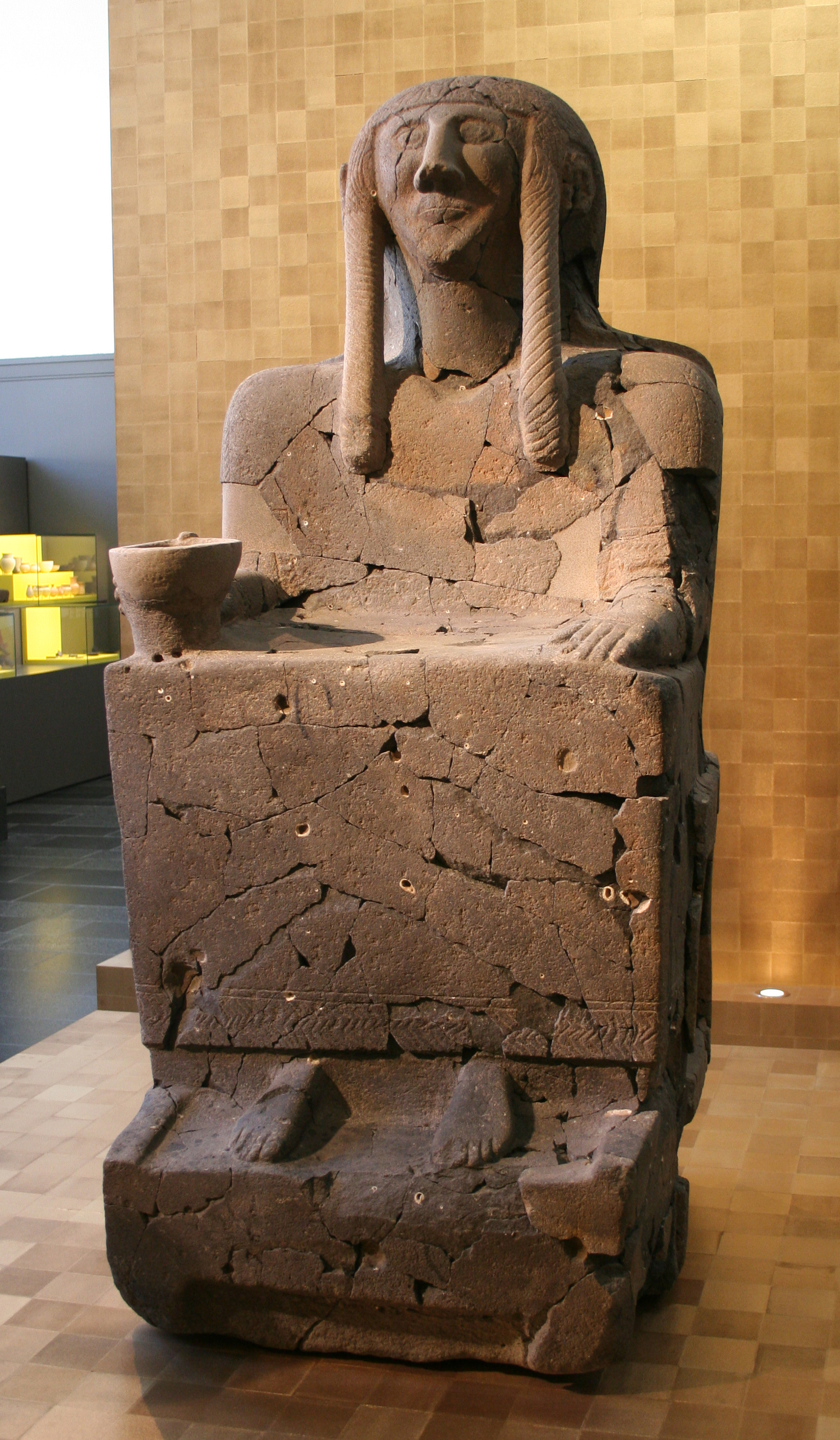
Excavated statue from the palace of Tell Halaf. Bit Bahiani period. Pergamonmuseum, Berlin

Bit Baḫiani was an independent Aramean city-state kingdom (c. 1200 – 808 BC) with its capital at Guzana (modern day Tell Halaf). Bit Baḫiani was ruled by King Kapara. There were at least five kings and four governors of Bit Baḫiani before losing its name in usage.
