= Tell Halaf =

Archaeological site in Syria

- تل حلف (Arabic)
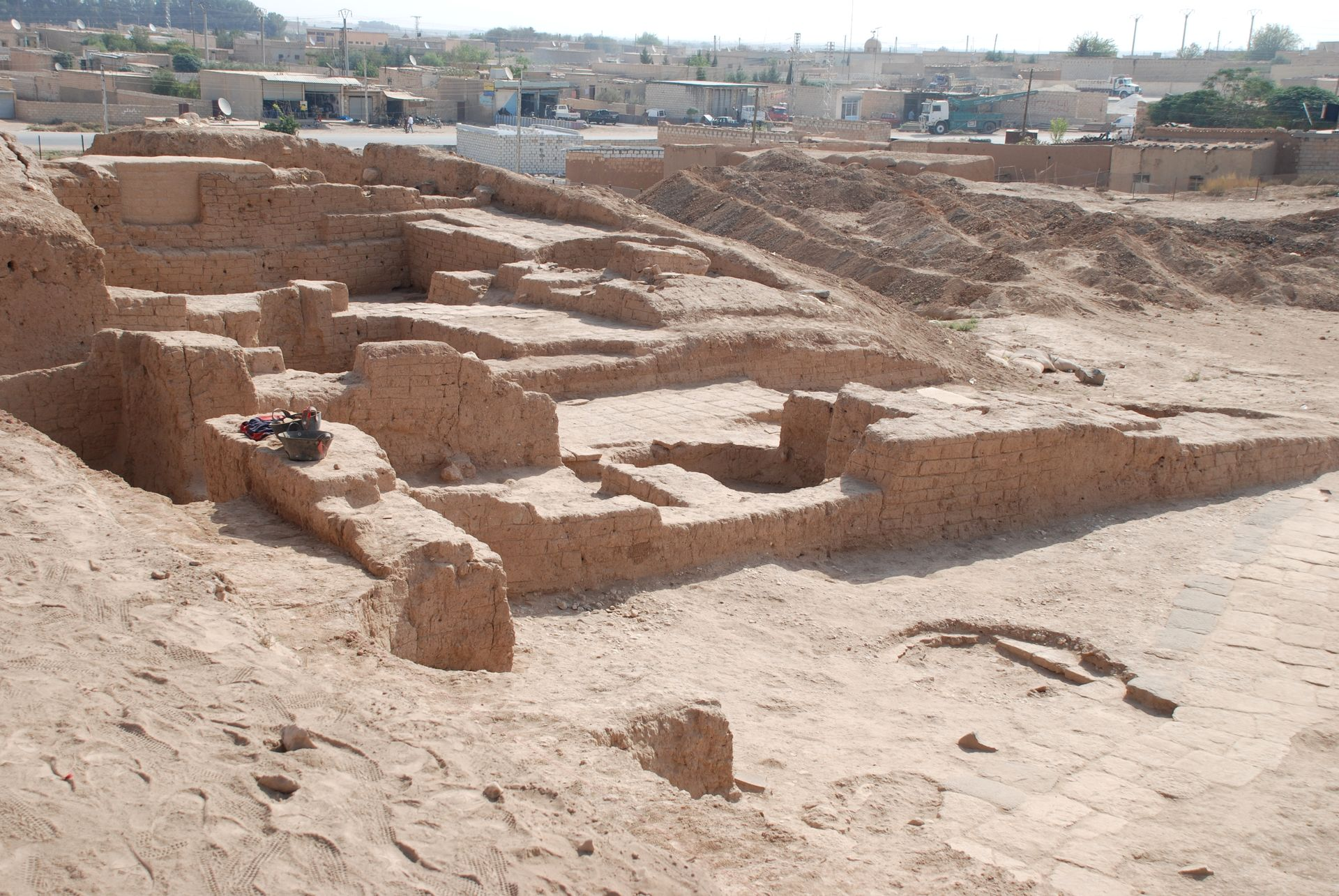
- Part of the excavated ruins of Tell Halaf in 2009

- Location within Near East Location within Syria
- 36°49′36″N 40°02′23″E
- Type: settlement
- Periods: Neolithic
- Cultures: Halaf culture
- Location: Al-Hasakah, Syria

History
- Built: c. 6100 BCE
- Abandoned: c. 5400 BCE

Site notes
- Excavation dates: 1911-1913, 1929; 2006-present
- Archaeologists: Max von Oppenheim; Lutz Martin; Abd al-Masih Bagdo
- Discovered: 19 November 1899
- Owner: Public
- Public access: Yes

Tell Halaf (Arabic: تل حلف) is an archaeological site in Al-Hasakah in northeastern Syria, a few kilometers from the city of Ras al-Ayn near the Syria–Turkey border. The site, which dates to the sixth millennium BCE, was the first to be excavated from a Neolithic culture, later called the Halaf culture, characterized by glazed pottery painted with geometric and animal designs.

It is thought to have been historically named Guzana, i.e. the Biblical Gozan.

== History ==
=== Neolithic (Halaf culture) ===
Tell Halaf is the type site of the Halaf culture, which developed from Neolithic III at this site without any strong break. The Tell Halaf site flourished from around 6100 to 5400 BCE, a period of time that is referred to as the Halaf period.

=== Chalcolithic ===
The Halaf culture was succeeded in northern Mesopotamia by the Ubaid culture (c. 5300-4300 BC). The site was then abandoned for a long period.

=== Late Bronze ===
==== Mitanni period ====
The Mitanni Empire controlled this region in the 15th century BC until around 1345 BC.

==== Hittite Period ====
In the Late Bronze, Suppiluliuma I of Hatti conquered the Mitanni stronghold of Carchemish, leading to the assassination of Tushratta of Mitanni around 1345 BC. With the fall of the Mitanni Empire, Carchemish became the seat of a Hittite viceroy who ruled the region with the remnants of Mitanni as a bufferstate to the independent Assyrians in the east. Tell Halaf became a Hittite city led by the viceroy of Carchemish.

=== Iron Age (Neo-Hittite Guzana) ===
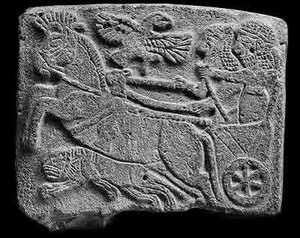
Hunting scene relief in basalt found at Tell Halaf, dated 850–830 BCE

This relief depicting a winged genie was once in the palace of King Kapara. Walters Art Museum, Baltimore.

Ramesses III of Egypt states in an inscription dating to his 8th Year from his Medinet Habu mortuary temple that Carchemish was destroyed by the "Sea Peoples". This was a period of climate change and social unrest caused by drought, weakening the central powers, and marking the transition from the Late Bronze to the Iron Age. Furthermore, it saw the emergences of Neo-Hittite city-states.

==== Kingdom of Bit Bahiani (Guzana) ====
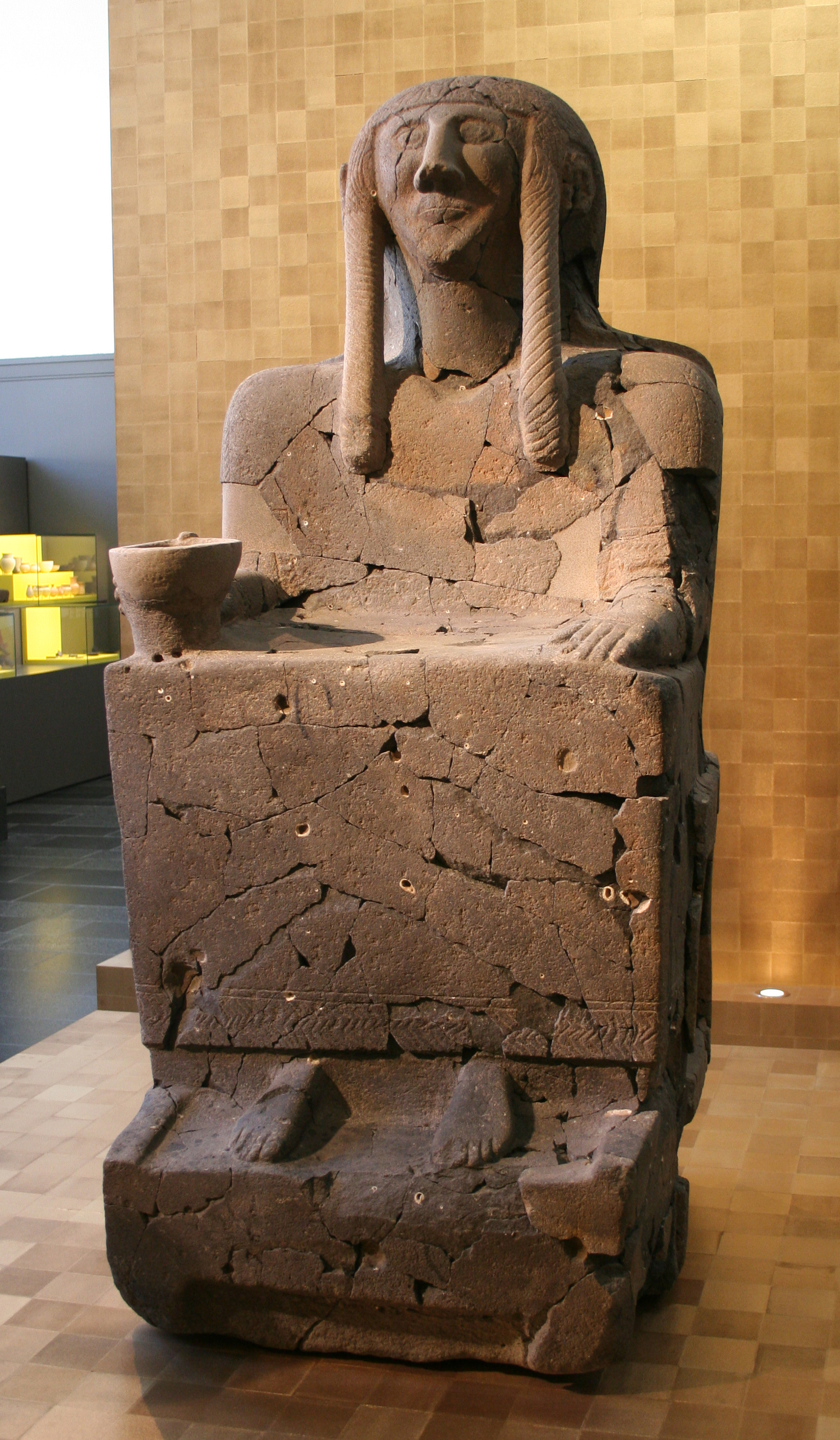
Excavated statue from the palace of Tell Halaf. Bit Bahiani period. Pergamonmuseum, Berlin

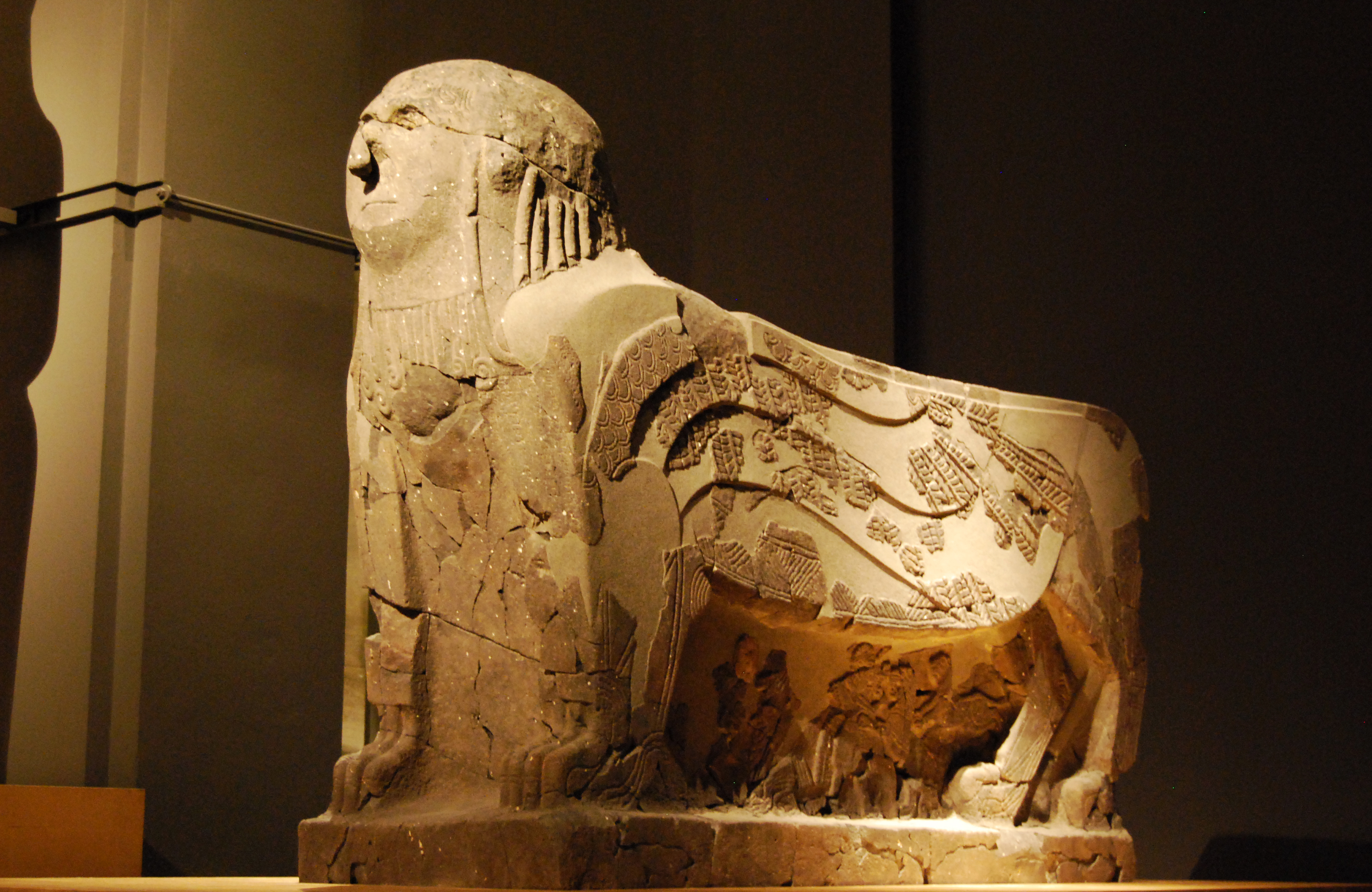
Sphinx from the Bit Bahiani period.

In the 10th century BCE, the rulers of the small Aramaean kingdom Bit Bahiani took their seat in Tell Halaf, re-founded as Guzana or Gozan. King Kapara built the so-called hilani, a palace in Neo-Hittite style with a rich decoration of statues and relief orthostats. These sculptures, even though it is not known how, were fundamental to the portrayal of Kapara along with their political power. By the end of the 9th century, it was a famous Syro-Hittite state.

==== Assyrian Period ====
In 894 BCE, the Assyrian king Adad-nirari II recorded the site in his archives as a tributary Aramaean city-state.

In 808 BCE, the city and its surrounding area was reduced to a province of the Assyrian Empire. The governor's seat was a palace in the eastern part of the citadel mound.

Guzana survived the collapse of the Assyrian Empire and remained inhabited until the Roman-Parthian Period.

In historical times, the mound itself became the citadel of the Aramaean and Assyrian city. The lower town extended 600 m N–S and 1000 m E–W. The citadel mound housed the palaces and other official buildings. Most prominent are the so-called Hilani or "Western Palace" with its rich decor, dating back to the time of King Kapara, and the "North-Eastern Palace", the seat of the Assyrian governors. In the lower town a temple (or cult room) in Assyrian style was discovered.

== Excavations ==
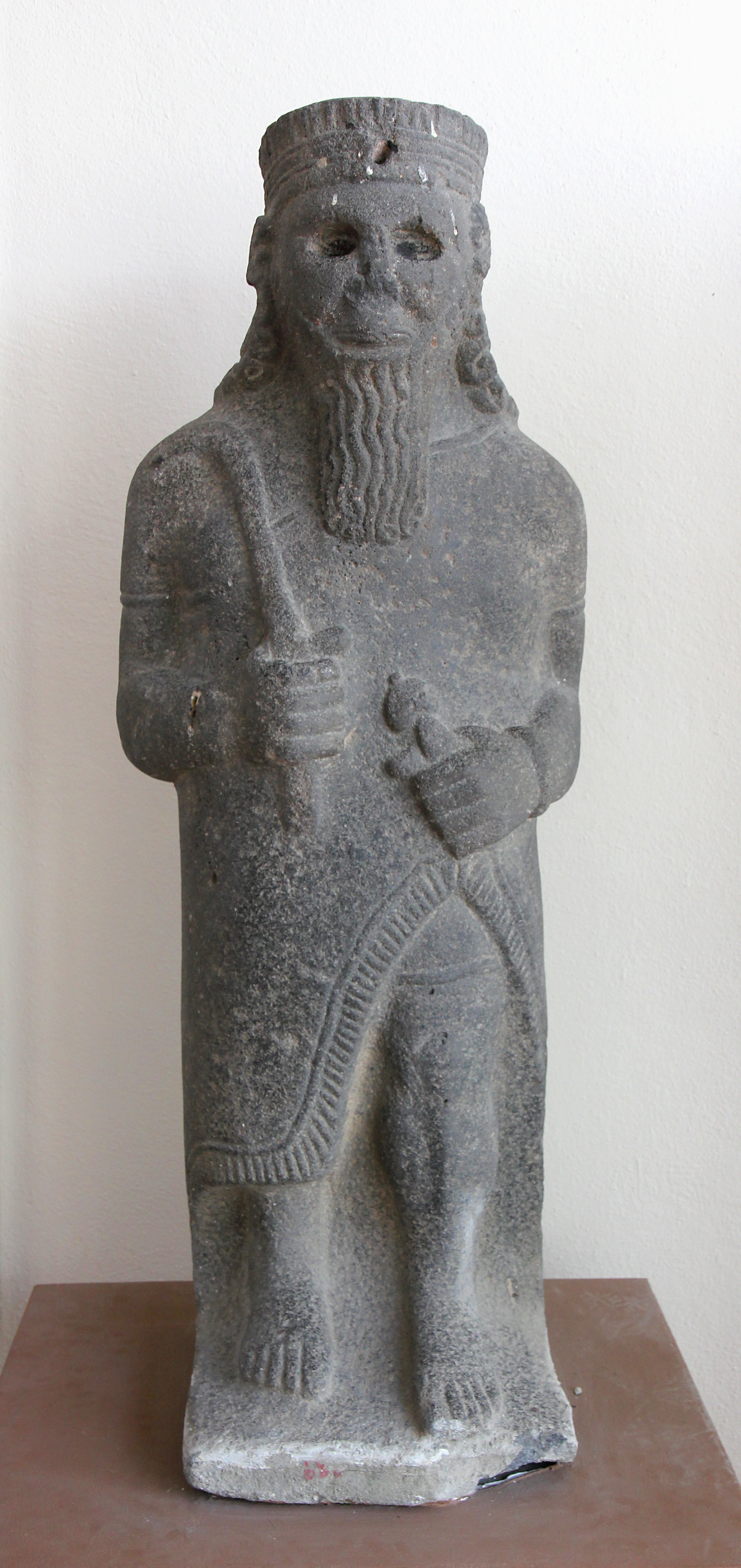
Statue of a male from the cult room at Tell Halaf, Late Hittite period. Today at the Adana Museum, Turkey.

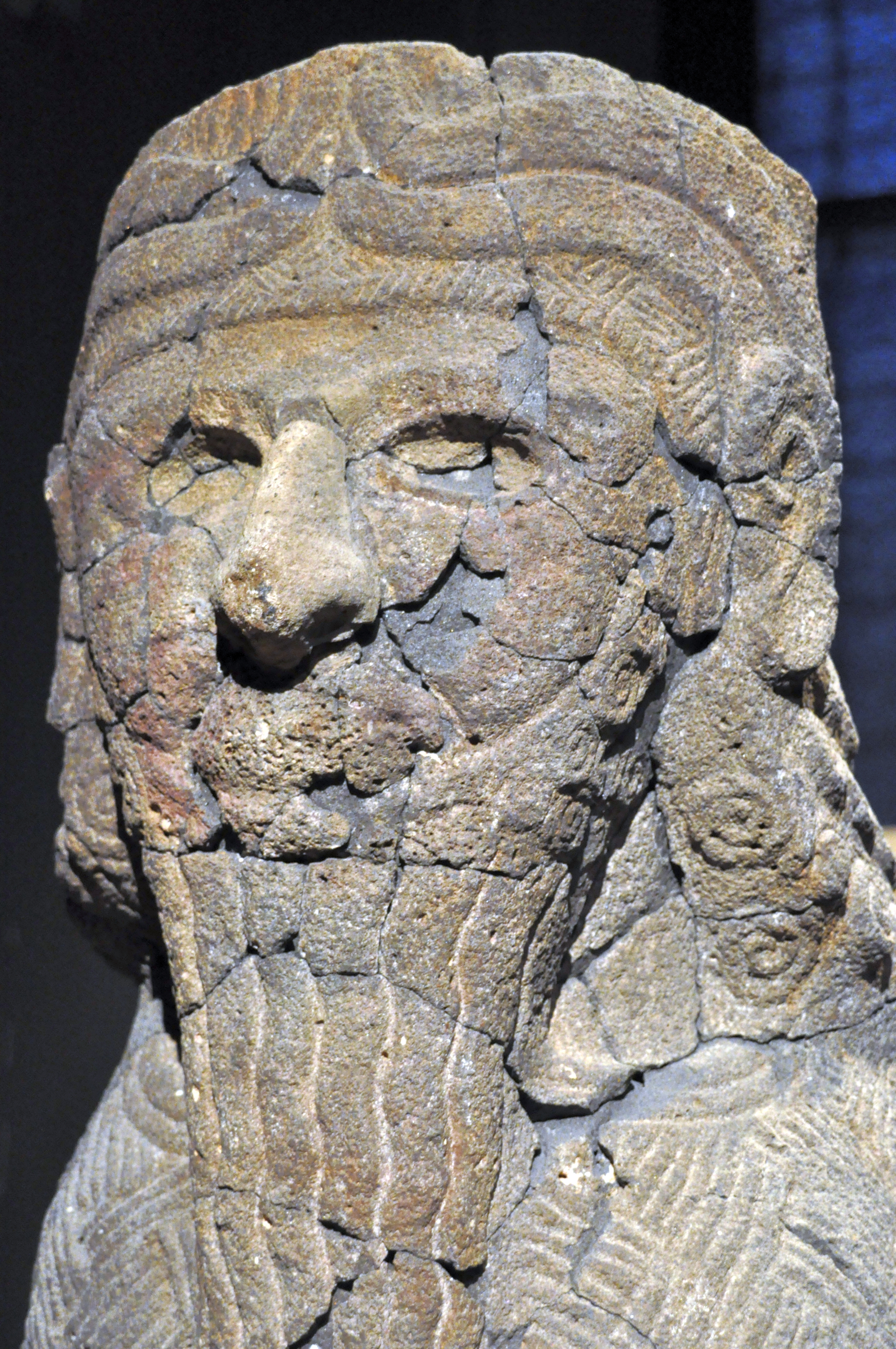
Scorpion-birdman from the Scorpion Gate at the Western Palace of Tell Halaf, damaged by fire in 1943 and restored

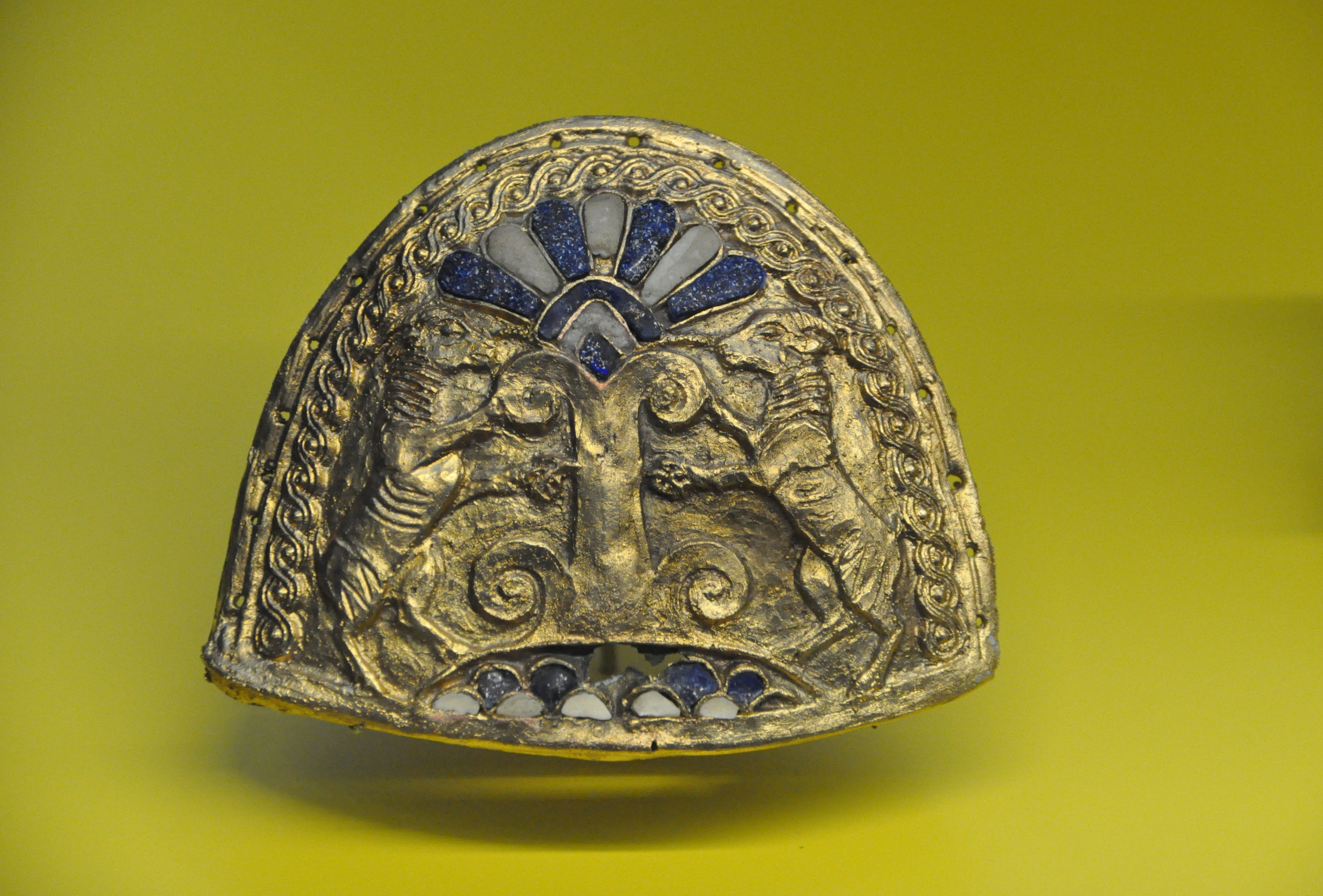
Replica of a gold clothing ornament found at Tell Halaf

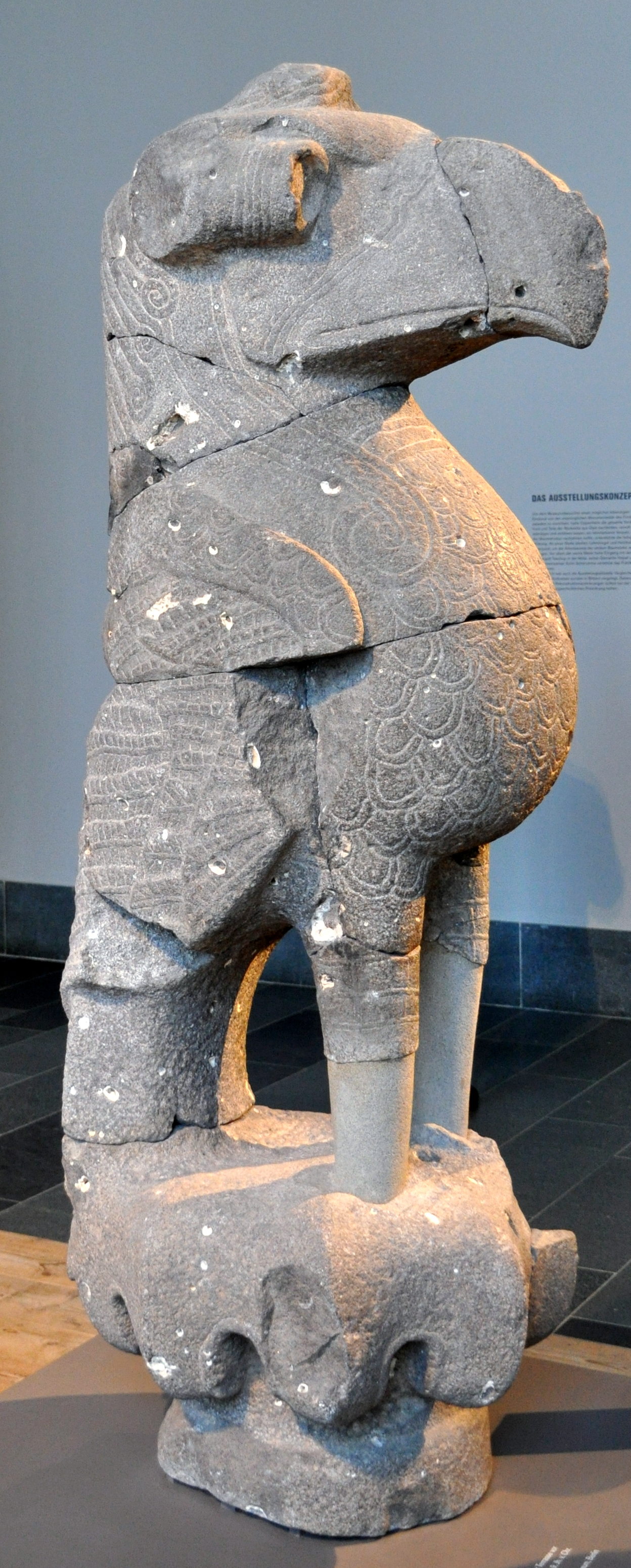
Reconstructed bird statue found at Tell Halaf (184 by 70 by 70 cm)

The site is located near the city of Ra's al-'Ayn in the fertile valley of the Khabur River (Nahr al-Khabur), close to the modern border with Turkey. The name Tell Halaf is a local Aramaic placename, tell meaning "hill", and Tell Halaf meaning "made of former city"; what its original inhabitants called their settlement is not known.

=== Discovery ===
In 1899, when the area was part of the Ottoman Empire, Max von Oppenheim, a German diplomat travelled from Cairo through northern Mesopotamia on behalf of Deutsche Bank, working on establishing a route for the Bagdad Railway. On 19 November, he discovered Tell Halaf, following up on tales told to him by local villagers of stone idols buried beneath the sand. Within three days, several significant pieces of statuary were uncovered, including a so-called "Sitting Goddess". A test pit uncovered the entrance to the "Western Palace". Since he had no legal permit to excavate, Oppenheim had the statues he found reburied and moved on.

=== Excavations by Max von Oppenheim ===
According to archaeologist Ernst Herzfeld, he had urged Oppenheim in 1907 to excavate Tell Halaf and they made some initial plans towards this goal at that time. In August 1910, Herzfeld wrote a letter calling on Oppenheim to explore the site and had it circulated to several leading archaeologists like Theodor Nöldeke or Ignác Goldziher to sign. Armed with this letter, Max von Oppenheim was now able to ask for his dismissal from the diplomatic service (which he did on 24 October 1910) while being able to call on financing from his father for the excavation.

With a team of five archaeologists, Oppenheim planned a digging campaign that began on 5 August 1911. Substantial amounts of equipment were imported from the German Empire, including a small steam train. The costs totaled around 750,000 Marks and were covered by von Oppenheim's father's banking fortune. On arrival, the archaeologists discovered that since 1899, locals had uncovered some of the findings and heavily damaged them – in part out of superstition, in part to gain valuable building material. Oppenheim had recruited five hundred locals from Tell Halaf to help towards the excavation.

During the excavations, Oppenheim found the ruins of the town of Guzana (or Gozan). Significant finds included the large statues and reliefs of the so-called "Western Palace" built by King Kapara, as well as a cult room and tombs. Some of the statuary was found reused in buildings from the Hellenistic period. In addition, they discovered Neolithic pottery of a type which became known as Halaf culture after the site where it was first found. At the time, this was the oldest painted pottery ever found (together with those discovered at Samarra by Herzfeld).

In 1913, Oppenheim decided to return temporarily to the German Empire. The finds of Tell Halaf were left at the building he and his team had inhabited during the dig. Most of them were securely packaged and stored. The outbreak of World War I prevented Oppenheim from returning. However, Oppenheim was able to sell some of the stone reliefs, pottery and other artefacts he had excavated to various museums after the war including the British Museum and Walters Art Museum in Baltimore.

In 1926, Germany joined the League of Nations and it thus became possible for German nationals to conduct excavations in what was now the French-ruled Mandate for Syria and the Lebanon. Preparing for new excavations, in 1927, Oppenheim again travelled to Tell Halaf. Artillery fire exchanged between Ottoman and French troops in the final days of the war had severely damaged the building and the archaeological findings had to be dug out of the rubble. Once again, it was found that the locals had damaged some of the stone workings. Since he had made plaster casts during the original excavation, Oppenheim was able to repair most of the damage done to the statues and orthostat reliefs. His finds were divided with the French authorities; his share (approximately 80, or about two-thirds of the total) was transported to Berlin, while the other 35 were brought to Aleppo to form the core collection of today's National Museum of Aleppo. In 1929, he resumed excavations and the new findings were divided.

=== Tell Halaf Museum, Berlin ===
Attempts by Oppenheim to have his findings exhibited at the newly constructed Pergamon Museum in Berlin failed, as the museum refused to agree to Oppenheim's financial demands. He thus opened his own private "Tell Halaf Museum" in an industrial complex in Berlin-Charlottenburg in July 1930. The museum's concept of presenting the exhibits is considered quite modern even by today's standards.

In 1939, Oppenheim once more travelled to Syria for excavations, coming within sight of Tell Halaf. However, the French authorities refused to award him a permit to dig and he had to depart. Oppenheim also unsuccessfully tried to sell some of his finds in New York and again negotiated with the German government about the purchase of the Tell Halaf artefacts. In 1943, eight German-owned orthostat reliefs stored in New York were seized by the US Office of Alien Property Custodian. Amid these negotiations and activities, the Tell Halaf Museum in Berlin was hit by a British phosphorus bomb in November 1943. It burnt down completely, all wooden and limestone exhibits were destroyed. Those made from basalt were exposed to a thermal shock during attempts to fight the fire and severely damaged. Many statues and reliefs burst into dozens of pieces. Although the Vorderasiatisches Museum Berlin took care of the remains, months passed before all of the pieces had been recovered and they were further damaged by frost and summer heat.

=== Reconstruction of the artefacts ===
Stored in the cellars of the Pergamon Museum during the period of communist rule under the GDR, the remains were left untouched. After reunification, the Masterplan Museumsinsel of 1999 brought up the idea of having the Western Palace front from Tell Halaf restored. With financial support from Sal. Oppenheim and the Deutsche Forschungsgemeinschaft the Vorderasiatisches Museum engaged in its largest-scale restoration project since the reconstruction of the Ishtar Gate. From 2001 to 2010, more than 30 sculptures were reconstructed out of around 27,000 fragments. They were exhibited at the Pergamon Museum in Berlin in 2011 and at the Bundeskunsthalle Bonn in 2014. When the reconstruction of the Museumsinsel is completed around 2025, the Western Palace façade will be the entrance to the new Vorderasiatisches Museum.

The many fragmented sculptures now evidence the story of their ancient heritage but also that of their journey through the 20th century: Oppenheim's destroyed Tell Halaf Museum was in East Berlin and could not be visited by anyone, including Oppenheim's family members, until the reunification of Germany in 1990. The 2019 exhibition Rayyane Tabet / Alien Property by Rayyane Tabet at the Metropolitan Museum of Art displays the museum's orthostat reliefs and Tabet's graphite transfers, Orthostates, in tandem with his family heirlooms, and addresses the role of an encyclopedic museum in conversation and collaboration with the past, and its voices.

=== New excavations ===
In 2006, new Syro-German excavations were started under the direction of Lutz Martin (Vorderasiatisches Museum Berlin), Abd al-Masih Bagdo (Directorate of Antiquities Hassake), Jörg Becker (University of Halle) and Mirko Novák (University of Bern).

== See also ==
- Cities of the Ancient Near East
- Beehive tomb
- Hadad-yith'i
