= National Museum of Aleppo =

Museum in Aleppo, Syria

National Museum of Aleppo متحف حلب الوطني
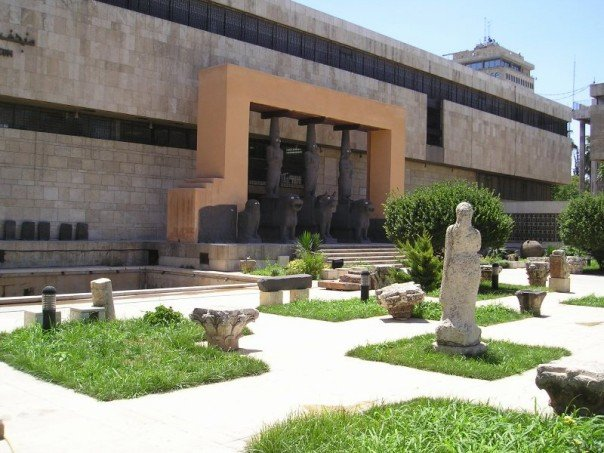
- The main entrance, a temple gateway from the Iron Age Neo-Hittite settlement of Tell Halaf

- Location in Aleppo
- Established: 1931
- Location: Baron Street, Aleppo, Syria
- Coordinates: 36.203754°N 37.150607°E
- Type: Archaeological

The National Museum of Aleppo (Arabic: متحف حلب الوطني) is the largest museum in the city of Aleppo, Syria, and was founded in 1931. It is located in the heart of the northern city on Baron Street, adjacent to the famous Baron Hotel and near the Bab al-Faraj Square and Clock Tower. The majority of the museum's exhibitions are devoted to the archaeology of Syria, with most of the finds coming from archaeological sites of the northern part of the country.

Artefacts inside the museum were damaged in the 2023 Turkey–Syria earthquake.

== History ==
In 1931, under the decision of the Syrian authorities, a small Ottoman palace was designated to become the National Museum in the city of Aleppo. After three decades, the building became too small to host the growing number of exhibited items. Therefore, it was decided in 1966 to demolish the old palace building and replace it with a larger, more modern structure. Construction of the new building commenced after Yugoslav architects Zdravko Bregovac and Vjenceslav Richter's project proposal won first prize for their competition entry.

In July 2016 the museum was hit by numerous missiles and mortar shells fired by rebel forces. This caused extensive damage to the roof and structure of the building. Most of the collection had already been evacuated but concerns have been expressed regarding items which could not be moved.

The museum's façade sustained cracks during the 2023 Turkey–Syria earthquakes on 6 February.

== Collections ==
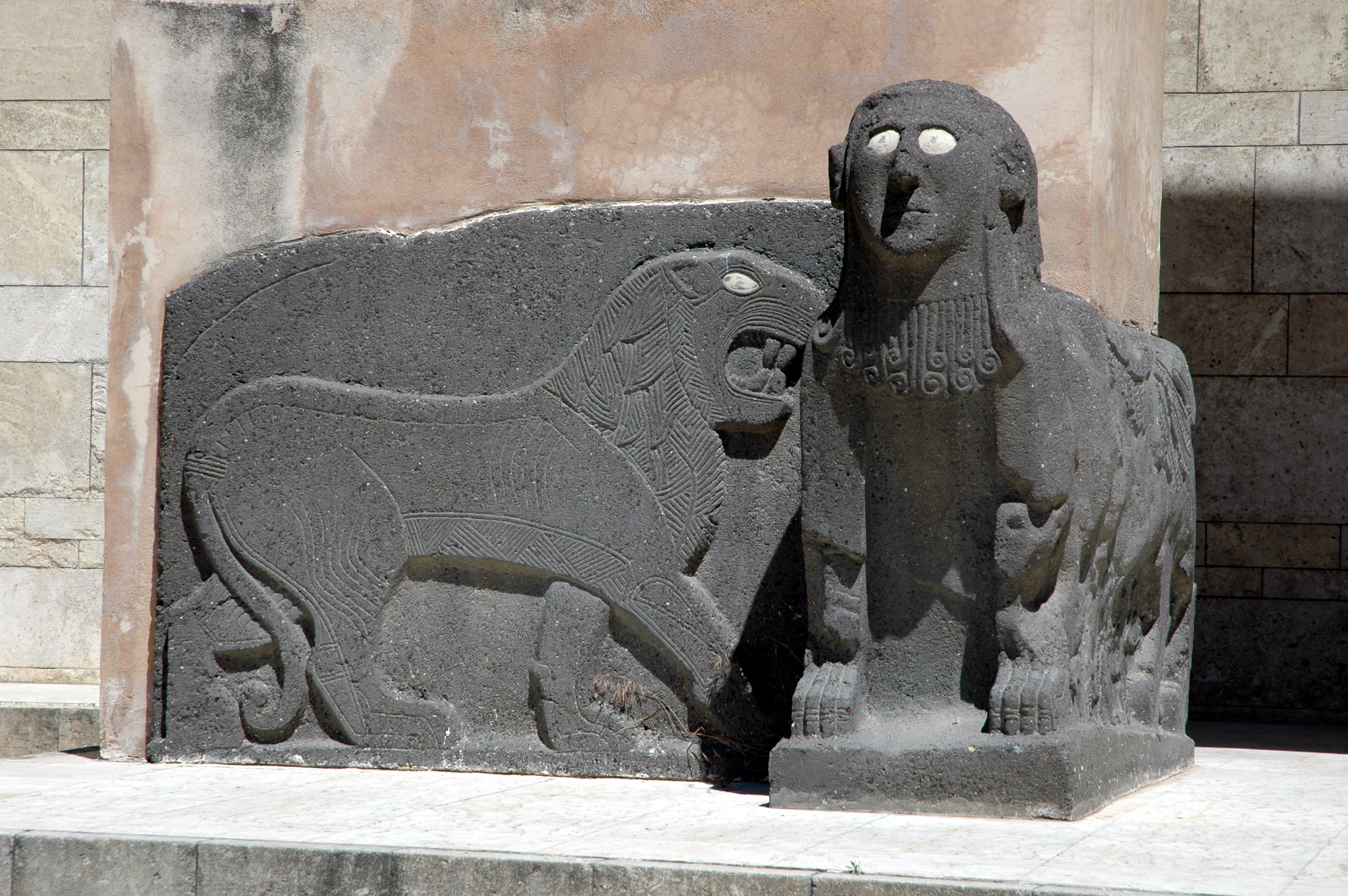
Statues at the entrance of the museum.

Items from all historical periods are exhibited in the museum. However, the largest sections of the museum are devoted to the Iron Age and the Islamic period. The entrance to the museum is a temple gateway with a female sphinx from the Iron Age (9th century BC) Neo-Hittite settlement of Tell Halaf.

=== Ground floor ===
The ground floor consists of two sections: the section of Prehistoric Culture and the section of Ancient Syrian Civilizations. The first section is a large hall containing numerous samples of human items and tools form the Stone Age found in the regions of Aleppo, Ain Dara and Ebla. It also contains the oldest civilized human shelter (8500 BC) brought from Mureybet.

The second section is divide into a group of halls, classified geographically according to the Syrian regions and dedicated to the ancient civilizations of Syria. Many Bronze Age objects from Hama and Ugarit are exhibited in the halls, statues and cuneiform scripts from Mari, as well as pieces discovered by Max Mallowan at the site of Tell Brak. Moreover, Iron Age materials and Assyrian style statues from archeological sites of the Al-Jazeera region, and the Euphrates region could be found.

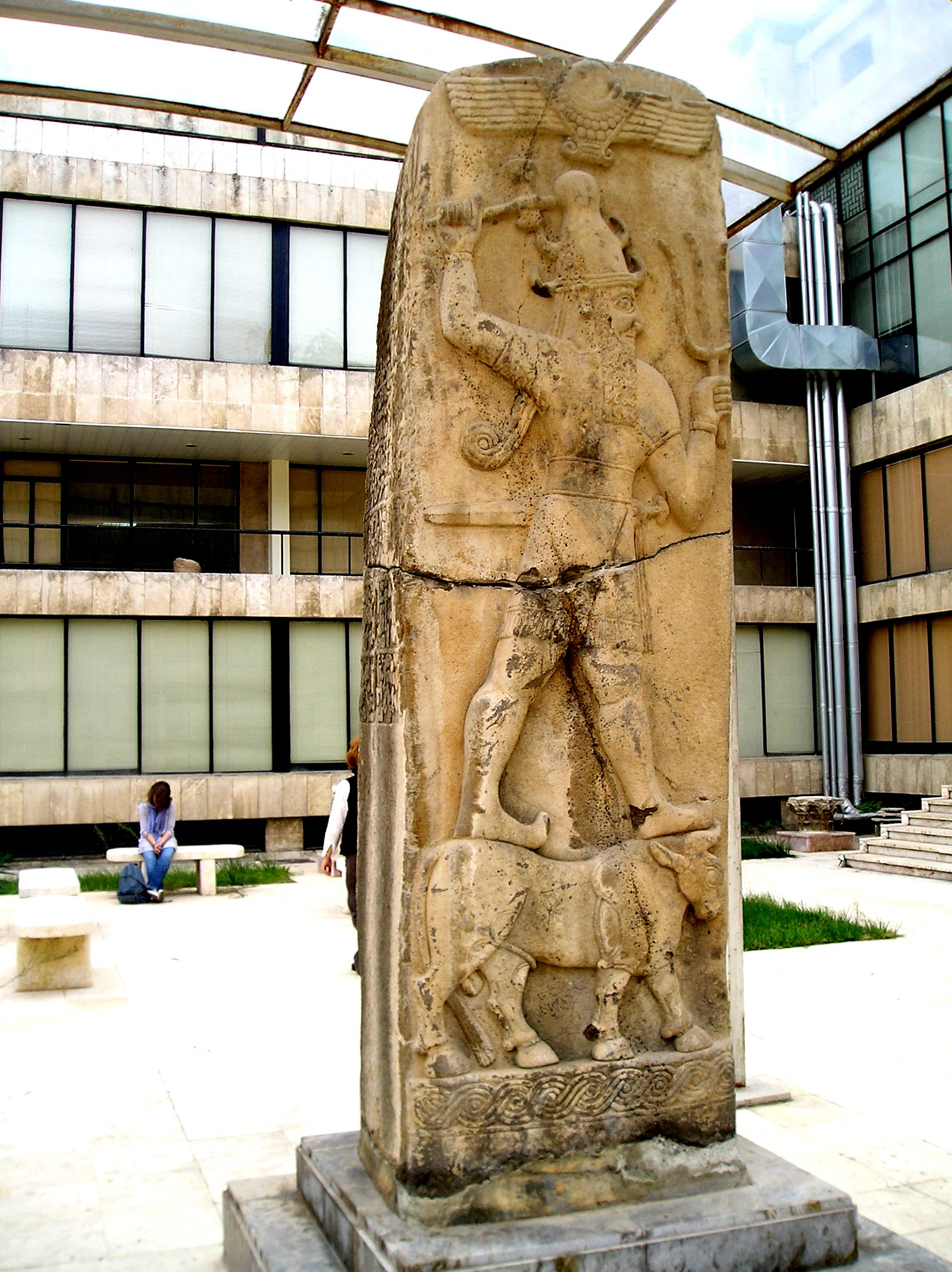
Tarhunzas, Tarhius or Teshub, the Neo-Hittite storm god

The main halls of this section are:

- The Hall of Al Jazeera Hills
- The Hall of Mari
- The Hall of Hama Region
- The Hall of Ugarit
- The Hall of Tell Halaf
- The Hall of Arslan Tash
- The Hall of Tell Ahmar
- The Hall of Ancient Statues and Cuneiform Scripts.
- The Hall of Ebla

=== Second floor ===
The upper floor of the museum contains three sections:

- The section of Classical Remnants: Exhibits several objects of Greek, Hellenistic, Roman and Byzantine periods, such as coins, mosaics glassware and potteries.
- The section of Arabic-Islamic History: This section contains several Arabic coins, manuscripts, potteries and an Islamic 12th-century tomb and a 12th-century astrolabe.
- The section of Modern Art: Dedicated to the modern artists of Aleppo and other Syrian cities. It contains a scale model of the old city of Aleppo and a sixth-century fantastic mosaic.

=== Courtyard ===
The internal courtyard of the museum is home to huge basaltic statues of ancient Hittite and Roman mythological characters and a big third-century mosaic figure. At the external courtyard, monuments of Assyrian, Aramaic, Byzantine and Arabic civilizations are exhibited.

== Gallery ==
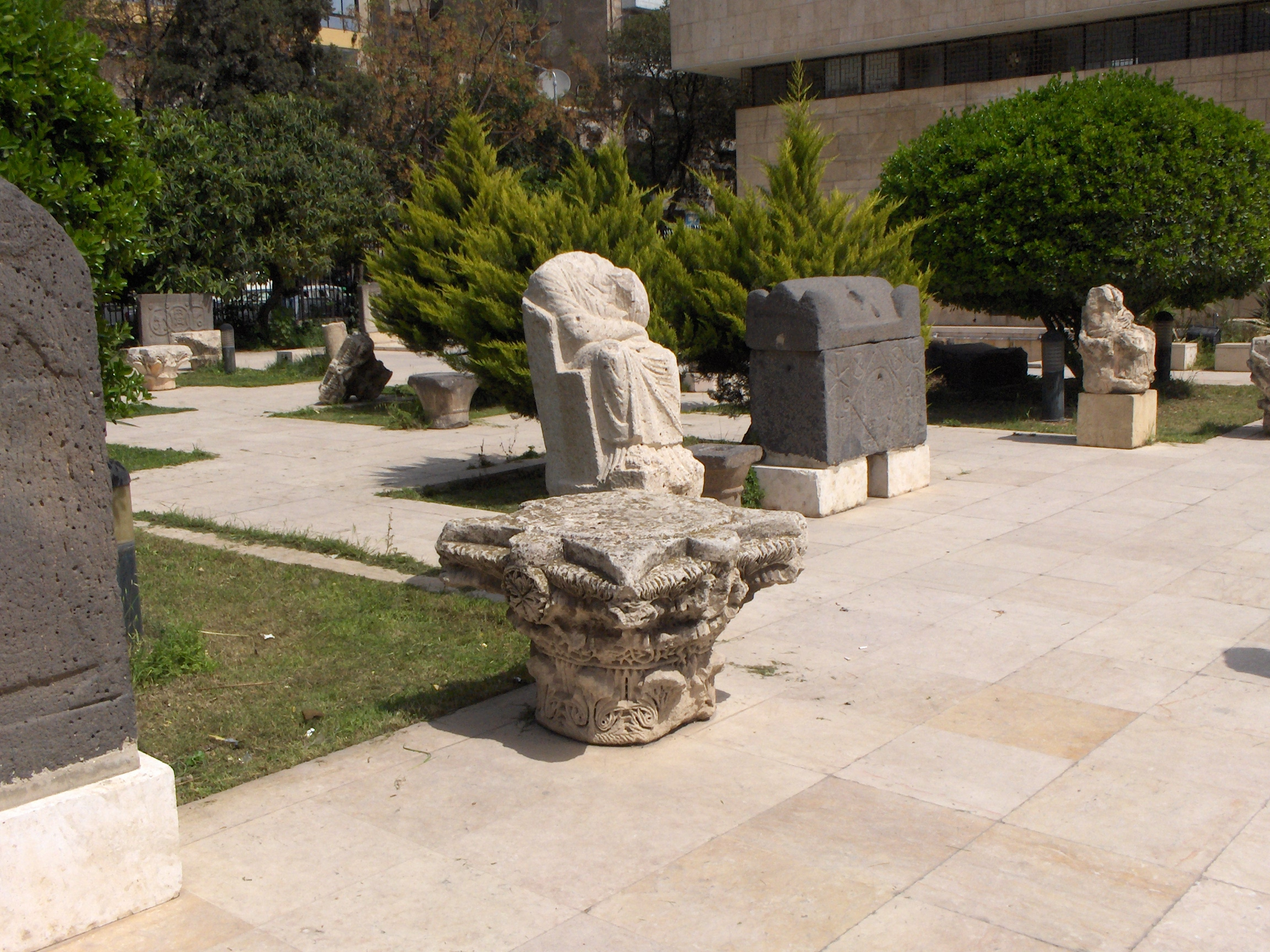
Statues at the museum yard

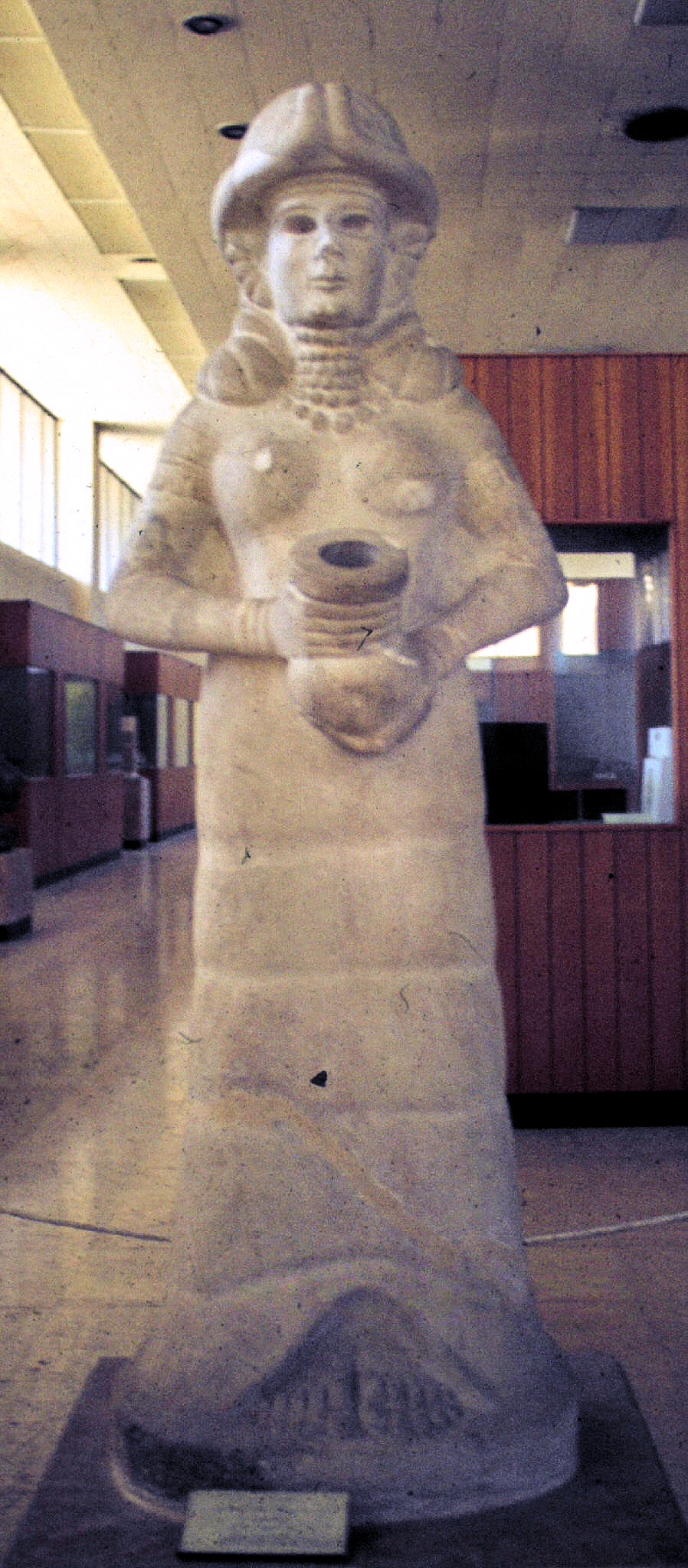
A historical statue from Mari

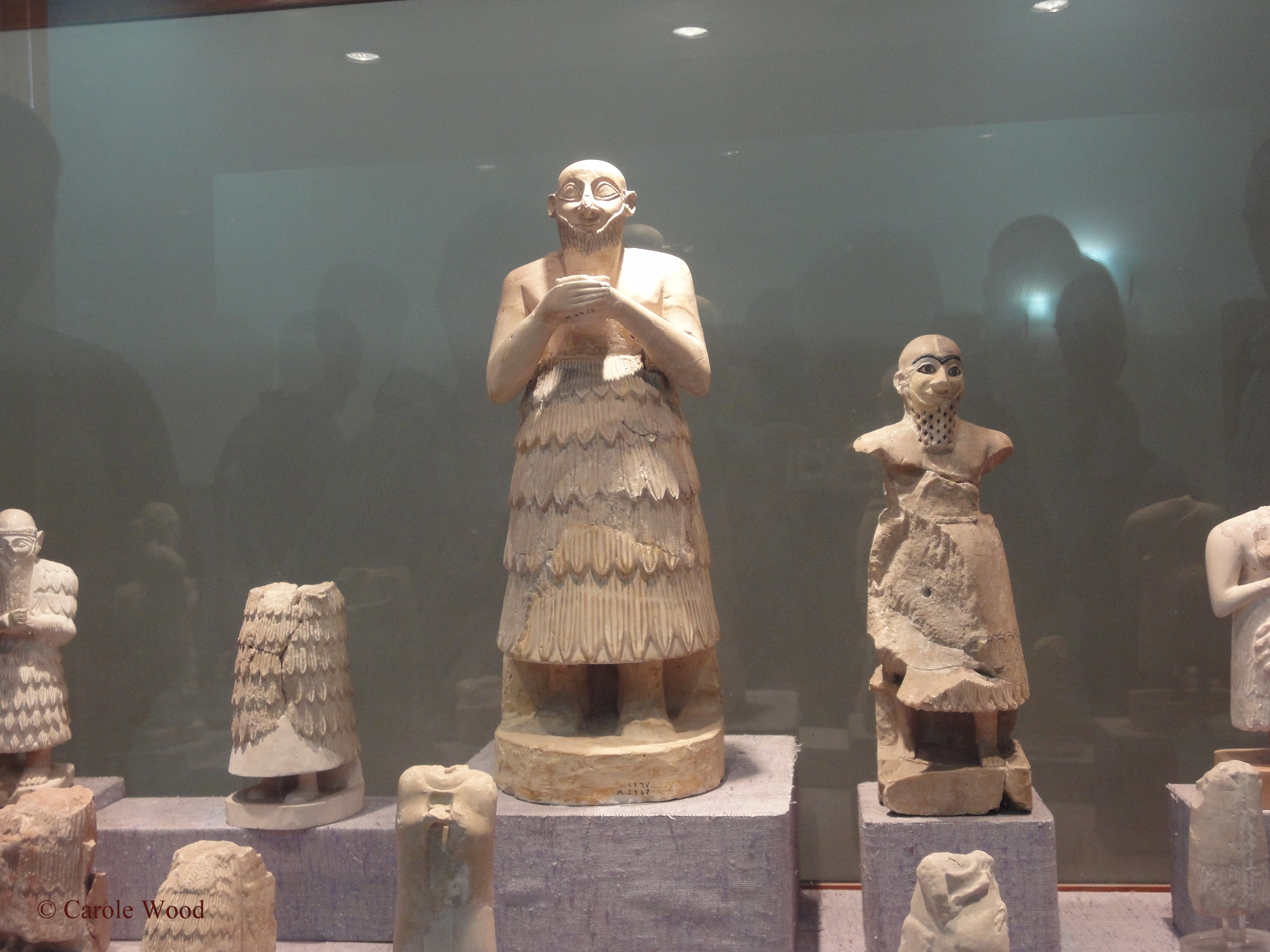
Statues from Mari in the Aleppo museum

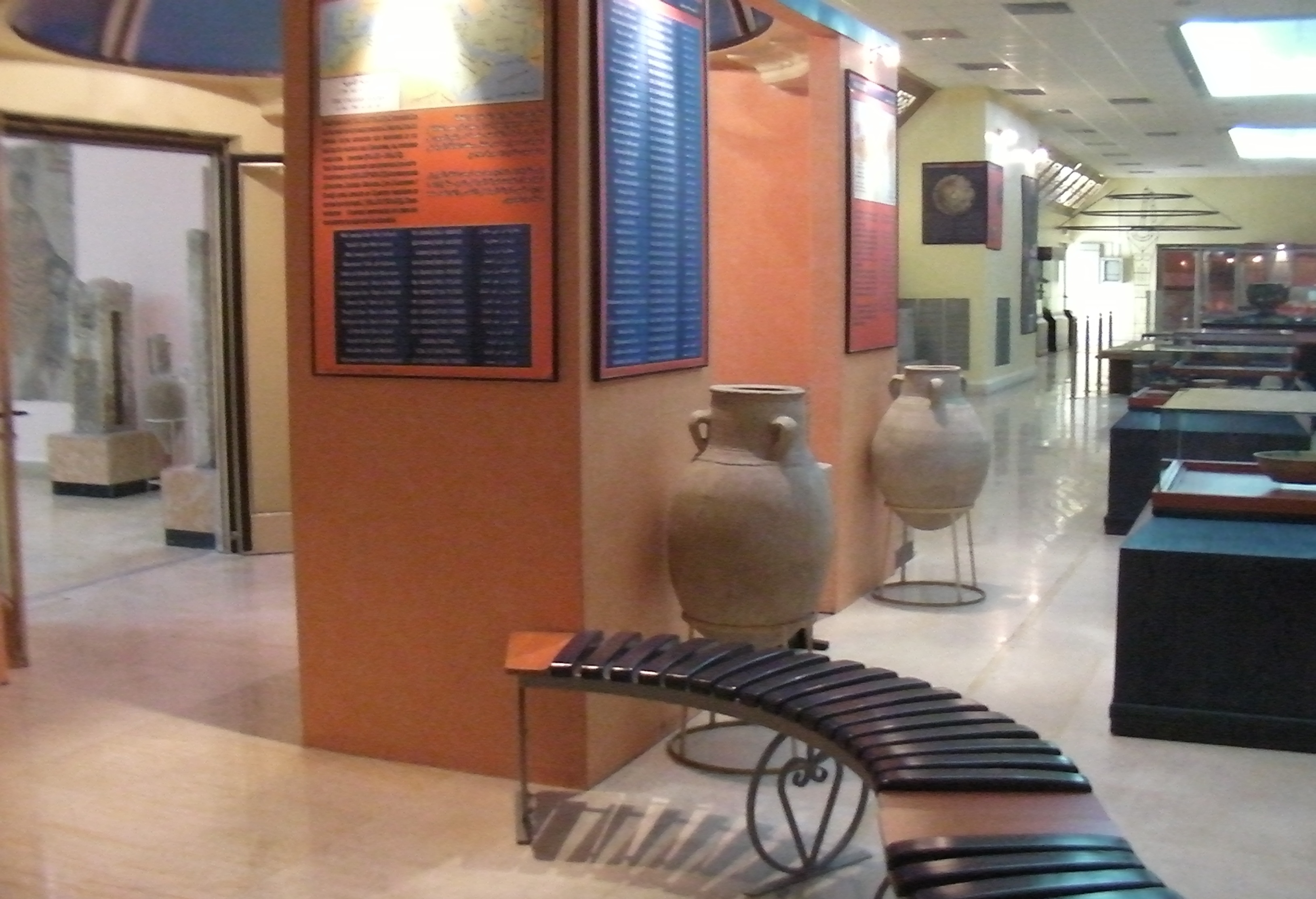
Inside the museum

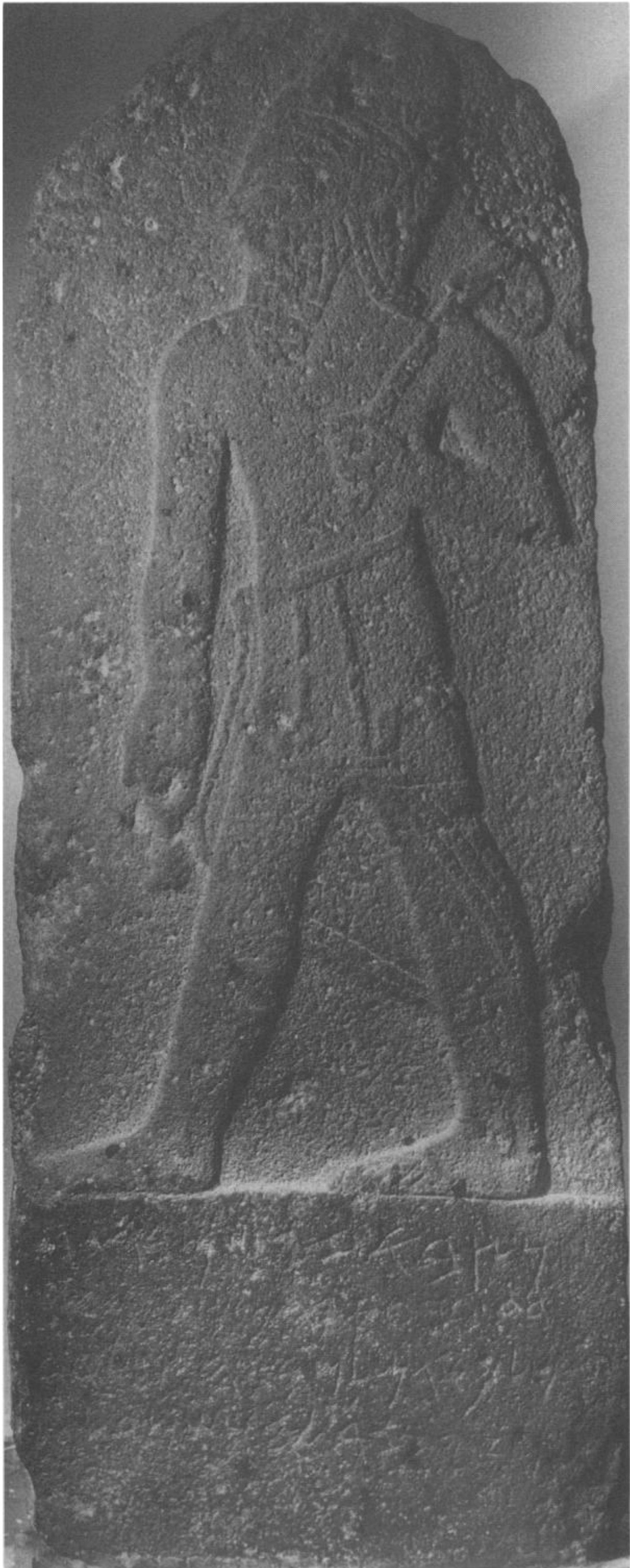
Melqart stele

== See also ==
- Deir ez-Zor Museum
- National Museum of Damascus
- List of museums in Syria
