= Name of Syria =

Country name

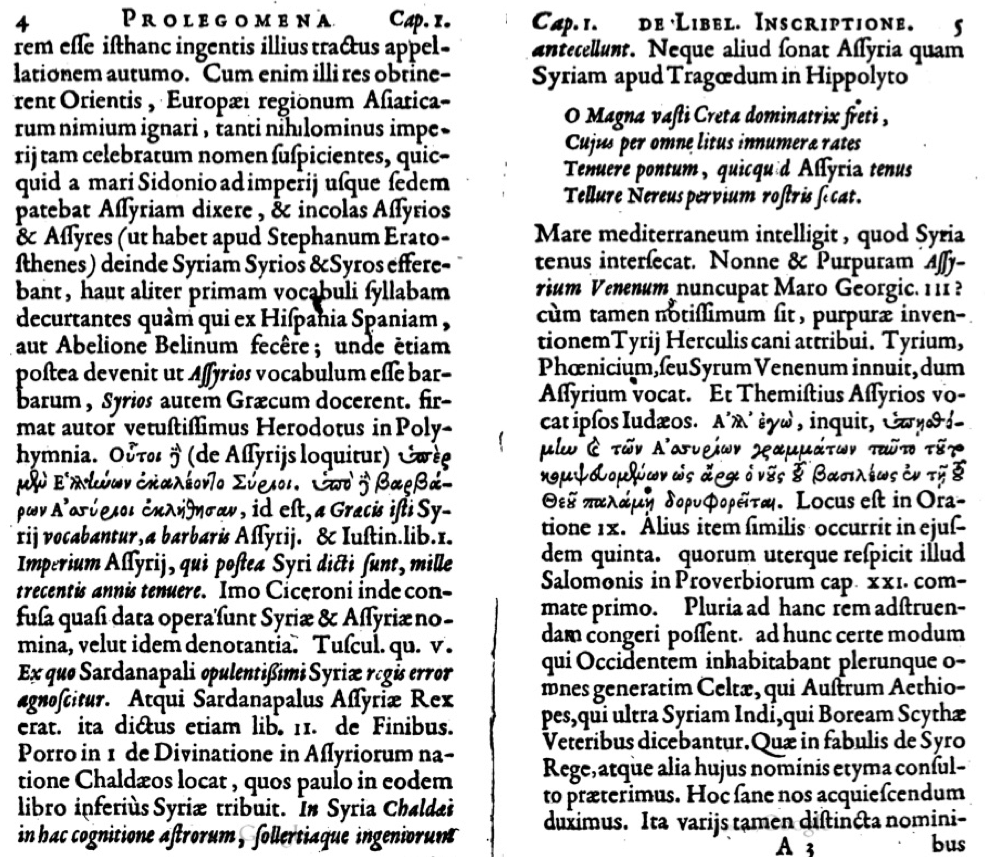
John Selden's 1617 section on the name of Syria and Assyria, from the 1629 edition

The name Syria is latinized from the Greek Συρία (Suría). In toponymic typology, the term Syria is classified among choronyms (proper names of regions and countries). The origin and usage of the term has been a subject of interest, both among ancient writers and modern scholars. In early Hittite, Luwian, Cilician and Greek usage between the 9th century BC and 2nd century BC, the terms Συρία (Suría) and Ασσυρία (Assuría) were used almost interchangeably, originally specifically referring to Assyria in Upper Mesopotamia.

Etymologically, the name Syria is linked to Assyria (Akkadian Aššur), which was a major ancient Mesopotamian civilization founded in modern-day northern Iraq in the 25th century BC. It expanded to include parts of Southeastern Anatolia and Northeastern Syria by the late Bronze Age and its empire eventually conquered much of Western Asia during the Iron Age, reaching Cyprus to the west, Caucasus to the north, Persia to the east, and Egypt and Arabia to the south. During the Middle Assyrian Empire (1365–1050 BC), Syria (apart from the Assyrian northeast corner) was known as Amurru ('The Land of the Amorites'). During the Neo-Assyrian Empire (911–605 BC) it was referred to as Eber Nari and Aram. These designations for modern Syria were continued by the Achaemenid Empire (539–332 BC), while Assyria remained known to the Achaemenids, Lydians and Armenians as Assyria.

Theodor Nöldeke in 1871 was the second to give philological support to the assumption that Syria and Assyria have the same etymology, following a suggestion going back to John Selden (1617). Current modern academic opinion strongly favours the connection, which has been reinforced by the discovery of 9th century BC inscriptions referring to Assyria as Syria.

Modern Syria (Arabic: الجمهورية العربية السورية, romanized: al-Jumhūriyya al-ʿArabiyya al-Sūriyya, lit. 'Syrian Arab Republic', since 1961) inherits its name from the Ottoman Syria vilayet (Vilâyet-i Sûriye), established in 1865. The choice of the ancient regional name, instead of a more common Ottoman practice of naming provinces according to provincial capitals, was seen as the reflection of a growing historical consciousness among the local intellectuals at the time.

The Classical Arabic name for the region is bilād aš-ša'm (بلاد اَلشَّأم 'The land of Shem', eldest son of Noah; Standard Arabic: اَلشَّام, romanized: aš-šām, from شأم š'm 'left hand'; 'northern').

== Etymology ==
The majority of modern scholars strongly support the already dominant position that Syrian and Syriac indeed derive from Assyrian, and the recent (1997) discovery of the bilingual Çineköy inscription from the 8th century BCE, written in the Luwian and Phoenician languages, seems to clearly confirm that Syria is ultimately derived from the Assyrian term Aššūrāyu.

Noting the scholarly consensus on questions related to interpretation of the terms Syria and Assyria in the Çineköy inscription, some researchers have also analyzed some similar terms that appear in other contemporary inscriptions, suggesting some additional interpretations.

The question was addressed from the Early Classical period through to the Renaissance era by the likes of Herodotus, Strabo, Justinus, Michael the Syrian and John Selden, with each of these stating that Syrian/Syriac was synonymous with and derivative of Assyrian. Acknowledgments were being made as early as the 5th century BC in the Hellenistic world that the Indo-European term Syrian was derived from the much earlier Assyrian.

Some 19th-century historians such as Ernest Renan had dismissed the etymological identity of the two toponyms. Various alternatives had been suggested, including derivation from Subartu (a term which most modern scholars in fact accept is itself an early name for Assyria, which was located in northern Mesopotamia), the Hurrian toponym Śu-ri, or Ṣūr (the Phoenician name of Tyre). Northern Syria is known as Ḫrw (Ḫuru, referring to the Hurrian occupants prior to the Aramaean invasion) in the Amarna Period of Egypt, and as Ărām (אֲרָם) in Biblical Hebrew. J. A. Tvedtnes had suggested that the Greek Suria is loaned from Coptic, and is due to a regular Coptic development of Ḫrw to *Šuri. In this case, the name would derive directly from that of the language isolate-speaking Hurrians, and be unrelated to the name Aššur. Tvedtnes' explanation was rejected as highly unlikely by Frye in 1992.

Various theories have been advanced as to the etymological connections between the two terms. Some scholars suggest that the term Assyria included a definite article, similar to the function of the Arabic language "Al-". Theodor Nöldeke in 1871 gave philological support to the assumption that Syria and Assyria have the same etymology, a suggestion going back to John Selden (1617) rooted in his own Hebrew tradition about the descent of Assyrians from Jokshan. Majority and mainstream current academic opinion strongly favours that Syria originates from Assyria. In a hieroglyphic Luwian and Phoenician bilingual monumental inscription found in Çineköy, Turkey, (the Çineköy inscription) belonging to Urikki, vassal king of Que (i.e. Cilicia), dating to the eighth century BC, reference is made to the relationship between his kingdom and his Assyrian overlords. The Luwian inscription reads su-ra/i whereas the Phoenician translation reads ʾšr, i.e. ašur "Assur", and also mentions ʾšrym "Assyrians", which according to Rollinger "settles the problem once and for all".

According to a different hypothesis, the name Syria might be derived from Sirion (Hebrew: שִׂרְיֹ֑ן Širyôn, (Note: The Semitic trilateral root of the word might be שָׂרָה, meaning to 'persist' or 'persevere'.) meaning 'breastplate') (Note: Later on, Christian Arameans used the term Syriacs in order to distinguish themselves from pagan Arameans.), the name that the Phoenicians (especially Sidonians) gave to Mount Hermon, (Note: The Hebrews called the mountain Hermon, while the Amorites referred to it as Šeni'r.) mentioned in an Ugaritic poem about Baal and Anath:

They [ ... ] from Lebanon and its trees, from [Siri]on its precious cedars.

— Poems about Baal and Anath (The Baal Cycle) translated by H.L. Ginsberg,

== History ==
Historical use of the term Syria can be divided into three periods. The first period, attested from the 8th century BCE, reflects the original Luwian and Cilician use of the term Syria as a clear synonym for Assyria, in reference to the empire of Assyria, rather than modern Syria (the historically Assyrian northeast aside) which was known as Aramea and Eber-Nari at that time, terms never applied to Assyria itself. Such use was recorded in the bilingual (Luwian-Phoenician) Çineköy inscription.

Through contacts with Luwians, Cilicians and Phoenicians, ancient Greeks also learned both variants (Syria/Assyria), used as synonyms, but later started to introduce some distinctions, thus marking the beginning of the second (transitional) period, attested by the works of Greek historian Herodotus (5th century BCE). Some instances in his writings reflect the original (synonymous) use of Syrian and Assyrian designations, when used for the Assyrian people in Mesopotamia and Anatolia. Herodotus explicitly stated that those called Syrians by the Greeks were called Assyrians by the non-Greeks, On the other side, he stated that Syrians were called Cappadocians, by Persians. Herodotus also introduced some distinctions regarding the territorial scope of the terms Syria and Assyria. Randolph Helm emphasized that Herodotus never applied the term Syria to the Mesopotamian and Anatolian region of Assyria, which he always called Assyria.

The third period was marked by definite territorialization of the term Syria, as distinct from Assyria. That process was finalized already during the Seleucid era (312–64 BCE), when Hellenistic (Greek) notions were applied in the region, and specific terms like Coele-Syria were introduced, corresponding to western regions (ancient Aram), unrelated to ancient Assyria which was still extant as a geopolitical entity in Mesopotamia, southeastern Anatolia and northeastern Syria.

Such distinctions were later inherited by the Romans, who created the province of Syria, for regions western of Euphrates, while Assyria represented a distinctive geographical term, related to Assyrian-inhabited regions in northern and eastern Mesopotamia and south east Anatolia. In the Roman Empire, Syria in its broadest sense referred to lands situated between Asia Minor and Egypt, i.e. the western Levant, while Assyria referred to Athura, part of the Persian Empire, and only very briefly came under Roman control (116–118 AD, marking the historical peak of Roman expansion), where it was administered as Assyria Provincia.

In 1864, the Ottoman Vilayet Law was promulgated to form the Syria Vilayet. The new provincial law was implemented in Damascus in 1865, and the reformed province was named Suriyya or Suriye, reflecting a growing historical consciousness among the local intellectuals.

== See also ==
- Syria (region)
- Assyria
- History of Syria
- Terms for Syriac Christians
- Assyrian people
- Çineköy inscription
- Names of the Levant

== Sources ==
- Andrade, Nathanael J. (2013). Syrian Identity in the Greco-Roman World. Cambridge: Cambridge University Press. ISBN 9781107244566.
- Andrade, Nathanael J. (2011). "Framing the Syrian of Late Antiquity: Engagements with Hellenism". Journal of Modern Hellenism. 28 (2010-2011): 1–46.
- Andrade, Nathanael J. (2014). "Assyrians, Syrians and the Greek Language in the late Hellenistic and Roman Imperial Periods". Journal of Near Eastern Studies. 73 (2): 299–317. doi:10.1086/677249. JSTOR 10.1086/677249. S2CID 163755644.
- Andrade, Nathanael J. (2019). "Syriac and Syrians in the Later Roman Empire: Questions of identity". The Syriac World. London: Routledge. pp. 157–174. doi:10.4324/9781315708195-15. Archived from the original on 2021-12-04.
- Bagg, Ariel M. (2017). "Assyria and the West: Syria and the Levant". A Companion to Assyria. Hoboken: John Wiley & Sons. pp. 268–274. doi:10.1002/9781118325216.CH13. Archived from the original on 2022-04-17.
- Cook, David (2009). "Syria and the Arabs". A Companion to Late Antiquity. Malden: Blackwell Publishing. pp. 467–478. ISBN 9781405119801. Archived from the original on 2022-10-14.
- Debié, Muriel (2009). "Syriac Historiography and Identity Formation". Church History and Religious Culture. 89 (1–3): 93–114. doi:10.1163/187124109X408014. Archived from the original on 2021-12-28.
- Frenschkowski, Marco (2019). "Are Syrians Arameans? Some Preliminary Remarks on Syriac Ethnic Identity in Late Antiquity". Research on Israel and Aram: Autonomy, Independence and Related Issues. Tübingen: Mohr Siebeck. pp. 457–484. ISBN 9783161577192.
- Fiey, Jean Maurice (1965). "Assyriens ou Araméens?". L'Orient Syrien. 10: 141–160.
- Frye, Richard N. (1992). "Assyria and Syria: Synonyms". Journal of Near Eastern Studies. 51 (4): 281–285. doi:10.1086/373570. S2CID 161323237. Archived from the original on 2021-02-05.
- Frye, Richard N. (1997). "Assyria and Syria: Synonyms" (PDF). Journal of Assyrian Academic Studies. 11 (2): 30–36. Archived from the original (PDF) on 2020-07-13.
- Frye, Richard N. (1999). "Reply to John Joseph" (PDF). Journal of Assyrian Academic Studies. 13 (1): 69–70. Archived from the original (PDF) on 2020-07-11.
- Frye, Richard N. (2002). "Mapping Assyria". Ideologies as Intercultural Phenomena. Milano: Università di Bologna. pp. 75–78. ISBN 9788884831071.
- Heinrichs, Wolfhart (1993). "The Modern Assyrians - Name and Nation". Semitica: Serta philologica Constantino Tsereteli dicata. Torino: Zamorani. pp. 99–114. ISBN 9788871580241.
- Joseph, John B. (1997). "Assyria and Syria: Synonyms?" (PDF). Journal of Assyrian Academic Studies. 11 (2): 37–43. Archived from the original (PDF) on 2020-07-15.
- Joseph, John B. (1998). "The Bible and the Assyrians: It Kept their Memory Alive" (PDF). Journal of Assyrian Academic Studies. 12 (1): 70–76. Archived from the original (PDF) on 2020-07-15.
- Joseph, John B. (2000). The Modern Assyrians of the Middle East: A History of Their Encounter with Western Christian Missions, Archaeologists, and Colonial Powers. Leiden: Brill. ISBN 9004116419.
- Lipiński, Edward (2000). The Aramaeans: Their Ancient History, Culture, Religion. Leuven: Peeters Publishers. ISBN 9789042908598.
- Lipiński, Edward (2013). "The Aramaeans in the West (13th–8th centuries)". Arameans, Chaldeans, and Arabs in Babylonia and Palestine in the First Millennium B.C. Wiesbaden: Harrassowitz Verlag. pp. 123–147. ISBN 9783447065443.
- Masters, Bruce (2013). The Arabs of the Ottoman Empire, 1516-1918: A Social and Cultural History. Cambridge: Cambridge University Press. ISBN 9781107033634.
- Messo, Johny (2011). "The Origin of the Terms Syria(n) and Suryoyo: Once Again". Parole de l'Orient. 36: 111–125. Archived from the original on 2021-10-05.
- Messo, Johny (2017). Arameans and the Making of Assyrians: The Last Aramaic-speaking Christians of the Middle East. Aramaic Press. Archived from the original on 2022-03-17.
- Millard, Alan R. (1983). "Assyrians and Arameans". Iraq: British Institute for the Study of Iraq. 45 (1): 101–108. doi:10.2307/4200184. JSTOR 4200184. Archived from the original on 2020-06-30.
- Nöldeke, Theodor (1871). "Ασσύριος Σύριος Σύρος". Hermes. 5 (3): 443–468. JSTOR 4471183. Archived from the original on 2021-05-26.
- Rollinger, Robert (2006a). "Assyrios, Syrios, Syros und Leukosyros". Die Welt des Orients. 36: 72–82. JSTOR 25684050. Archived from the original on 2021-01-12.
- Rollinger, Robert (2006b). "The Terms Assyria and Syria Again" (PDF). Journal of Near Eastern Studies. 65 (4): 283–287. doi:10.1086/511103. S2CID 162760021. Archived (PDF) from the original on 2017-10-10.
- Rompay, Lucas van (2008). "The East: Syria and Mesopotamia". The Oxford Handbook of Early Christian Studies. Oxford: Oxford University Press. pp. 365–386. ISBN 978-0-19-927156-6.
- Schwartz, Eduard (1931). "Einiges über Assyrien, Syrien und Koilesyrien". Philologus. 86 (1–4): 373–399. doi:10.1524/phil.1931.86.14.380. S2CID 163792609.
- Schwartz, Eduard (1932). "Noch einiges über Assyrien und Syrien". Philologus. 87: 261–263. doi:10.1515/phil-1932-0208. S2CID 164348684.
- Shepardson, Christine (2009). "Syria, Syriac, Syrian: Negotiating East and West". A Companion to Late Antiquity. Malden: Blackwell Publishing. pp. 455–466. ISBN 9781405119801. Archived from the original on 2022-10-14.
- Simon, Zsolt (2012). "Where is the Land of Sura of the Hieroglyphic Luwian inscription KARKAMIŠ A4b and Why Were Cappadocians Called Syrians by Greeks?". Altorientalische Forschungen. 39 (1): 167–180. doi:10.1524/aofo.2012.0011. S2CID 163257058.
- Tekoğlu, Recai; Lemaire, André; İpek, İsmet; Tosun, Kazım (2000). "La bilingue royale louvito-phénicienne de Çineköy". Comptes rendus des séances de l'Académie des Inscriptions et Belles-Lettres. 144 (3): 961–1007. Archived from the original on 2020-12-12.
- Tvedtnes, John A. (1981). "The Origin of the Name Syria". Journal of Near Eastern Studies. 40 (2): 139–140. doi:10.1086/372868. S2CID 161771865. Archived from the original on 2020-07-28.
- Wood, Philip (2007). "Syrian Identity in the Cave of Treasures". The Harp. 22: 131–140. doi:10.31826/9781463233112-010. ISBN 9781463233112. Archived from the original on 2023-08-09.
