= Terms for Syriac Christians =

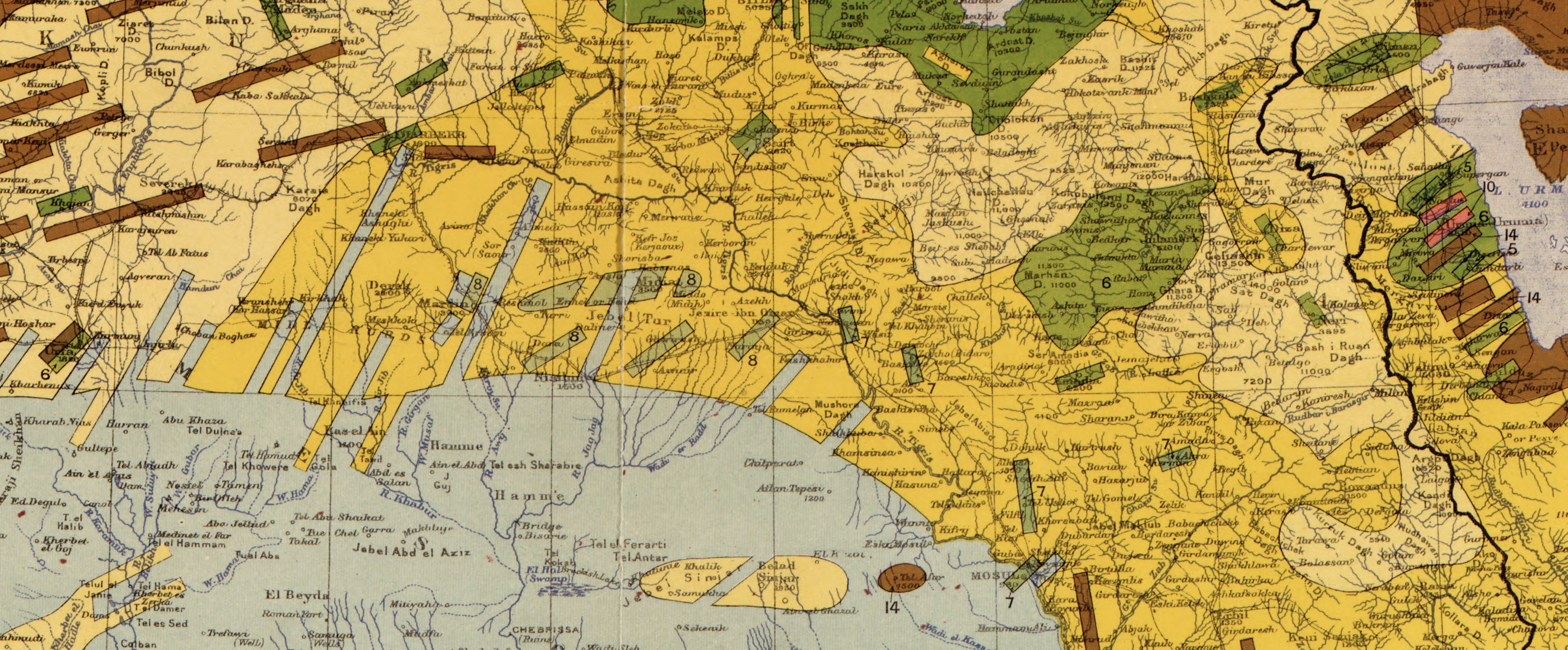
Maunsell's map, a Pre-World War I British Ethnographical Map of the Middle East showing (6) "Nestorians" around Urmia, Salmas and Julamerk, (7) "Chaldeans" along the Tigris river valley, and (8) "Jacobites" in Tur Abdin.

Terms for Syriac Christians are endonymic (native) and exonymic (foreign) terms, that are used as designations for Syriac Christians, as adherents of Syriac Christianity. In its widest scope, Syriac Christianity encompass all Christian denominations that follow East Syriac Rite or West Syriac Rite, and thus use Classical Syriac as their main liturgical language. Traditional divisions among Syriac Christians along denominational lines are reflected in the use of various theological and ecclesiological designations, both historical and modern. Specific terms such as: Jacobites, Saint Thomas Syrian Christians, Maronites, Melkites, Nasranis, and Nestorians have been used in reference to distinctive groups and branches of Eastern Christianity, including those of Syriac liturgical and linguistic traditions. Some of those terms are polysemic, and their uses (both historical and modern) have been a subject of terminological disputes between different communities, and also among scholars.

Territorially, Syriac Christians are divided in two principal groups: Syriac Christians of the Near East, and Syriac Christians of India. Terminology related to Syriac Christians of the Near East includes a specific group of ethnoreligious terms, related to various Semitic communities of Neo-Aramaic-speaking Christians, that are indigenous to modern Syria, Iraq, Iran, Turkey, Lebanon, Israel, Jordan, and Palestine.

Syriac Christians of the Near-Eastern (Semitic) origin use several terms for their self-designation. In alphabetical order, main terms are: Arameans, Assyrians, Chaldeans, Phoenicians and Syriacs. Each of those polysemic terms has a complex semantic history. First four of those names are expressing and implying direct connections with distinctive Semitic peoples of the Ancient Near East (ancient Arameans, ancient Assyrians, ancient Chaldeans, and ancient Phoenicians), while the fifth term (Syriacs) stems from a very complex etymology of the term Syria, and thus has a wide range of onomastic meanings, both historical and modern.

Terminology related to several groups of Arab Christians and other Arabic-speaking Christians who are adherents of Syriac Christianity, presents a specific challenge. Some of those questions, related to geopolitical affiliations and cultural Arabization, are of particular interest for the remaining communities of Syriac Christians in Arab countries of the Near East. In modern times, specific terminological challenges arose after 1918, with the creation of a new political entity in the Near East, called Syria, thus giving a distinctive geopolitical meaning to the adjective Syrian. Distinction between Syrian Christians as Christians from Syria in general, and Syriac Christians as Syriac-Rite Christians, is observed in modern English terminology.

== Religious terms for Syriac Christians ==
Historical divisions within Syriac Christianity in the Near East

Syriac Christians belong to several Christian denominations, both historical and modern. Various terms that are applied to those denominations are also used to designate Syriac Christian communities that belong to distinctive branches of the Christian denominational tree. Most important of those terms are: Jacobites, Saint Thomas Syrian Christians, Maronites, Melkites, Nasranis, and Nestorians, each of them designating a distinctive community, with its particular theological and historical traditions.

Historically, Syriac Christianity emerged in the Near East, among Aramaic-speaking communities that accepted Christianity during the first centuries of Christian history. Politically, those communities were divided between eastern regions (ruled in turn by Parthian and Persian empires), and western regions (ruled by the Roman, or Byzantine empire). That division created a specific notions of "East" and "West" within Syriac Christianity, with first term designating regions under Parthian/Persian rule, and second those under Roman/Byzantine rule.

After the emergence of major theological disputes and divisions (4th–7th century), regional distinction between eastern and western branches of Syriac Christianity gained additional significance. A majority of eastern Syriac Christians adhered to the Church of the East, while a majority of those in the western regions adhered to the Syriac Orthodox Church. At the same time, Aramaic-speaking Christian communities in some regions (like Byzantine Palestine) opted for the Chalcedonian Christianity. All of those divisions created a basis for the emergence of several denominational terms, created as endonymic (native) or exonymic (foreign) designations for distinctive Christian communities. Main of those terms were, in alphabetical order: Jacobites, Maronites, Melkites, and Nestorians. All of those terms are denominational, without ethnic connotations.

=== Syriac Jacobites ===
During the 5th and 6th century, Christological disputes related to monophysitism and miaphysitism led to the emergence of lasting divisions among Eastern Christians throughout the Near East. Miaphysite communities in the wider region of Syria (consisted of both Greek and Aramaic/Syriac adherents of miaphysitism) became known as Jacobites, after Jacob Baradaeus (d. 578), a prominent miaphysite metropolitan of Edessa who created a network of miaphysite ecclesiastical structures throughout the region. In later polemics between Christians, Jacobite appellation was often used by various opponents of miaphysitism as designation for heresy, thus creating basis for a complex history of the term. Various leaders of the miaphysite Syriac Orthodox Church have both rejected, or accepted the term. In polemic terminology, Jacobites were sometimes also labeled as Monophysites, a term they have always disputed, preferring to be referred to as Miaphysites.

=== Syriac Maronites ===
During the 7th century, renewed Christological disputes related to monoenergism and monothelitism led to the emergence of new divisions among Christians in the Near East. Some of those who accepted monothelite teachings became known as the Maronites, after their main center, the Monastery of Saint Maron, situated in northeastern region of modern Lebanon. Maronite community included both Greek-speaking and Aramaic-speaking adherents. During the following centuries, both Greek and Aramaic/Syriac traditions were gradually weakened by the process of Arabization. In modern times, renewed interest for patrimonial historical heritage among Catholic Maronites led to the revival of Aramaic/Syriac cultural traditions and Aramean identity.

=== Syriac Melkites ===
Official state support, provided by the Byzantine imperial authorities to adherents of Chalcedonian Christianity after 451, laid the foundation for the emergence of a new, specific use of Aramaic terms that designated those who were loyal to the Empire. This loyalty was understood not just in a political sense but also in regard to their acceptance of imperial religious policies. Throughout the Near East, all Christians who accepted the state-backed Chalcedonian Christianity became known as "Melkites", a term derived from the Aramaic word malkā (meaning ruler, king, emperor), thus designating those who were loyal to the Empire and its officially imposed religious policies.

The term "Melkites" originally designated all loyalists, regardless of their ethnicity (Arameans, Copts, Greeks, Jews, etc.), thus including those Aramaic-speaking Christians who adhered to Chalcedonian Christianity. Since Melkite communities were dominated by the Greek episcopate, the position of Aramaic-speaking Melkites within the wider Melkite community was somewhat secondary to that of Greek Melkites. This led to the gradual decline of Syriac-Aramaic traditions. Classical Syriac was initially the liturgical language of the Syriac Melkites in Antioch and parts of Syria, while some other Aramaic-speaking Melkites, predominantly of Jewish descent, used the Syro-Palestinian dialect in Palestine and Transjordan. The Syriac Melkites (Malkāyā Suryāyē in Aramaic) changed their church's West Syriac Rite to that of Constantinople in the 9th to 11th centuries, requiring new translations of all their Classical Syriac liturgical books. The decline of Syriac-Aramaic traditions among Syriac Melkites was further enhanced (since the 7th century) by gradual Arabization, since under Islamic rule, Arabic became the main language of public life and administration. In later centuries, several Melkite communities were split, thus creating additional distinctions between Orthodox Melkites and Catholic Melkites. Within both communities, Syriac Melkites are today represented by small minorities.

=== Syriac Nestorians ===
Theological controversies that arose in the first half of the 5th century regarding the teachings of Nestorius (d. c. 450) resulted in the creation of a specific term: Nestorians, that was used to designate those Christians who shared his views in the fields of Christology and Mariology. That term was applied to all who agreed with teaching of Nestorius, both within the borders of Roman Empire and beyond, regardless of their ethnic, linguistic or other backgrounds. Among Greek Christians, Nestorianism was eventually suppressed, but within some communities of Syriac Christians, particularly those beyond Byzantine imperial borders, support for Nestorius persisted, particularly within the Church of the East in the Sassanian Empire, where Nestorius came to be counted among the teachers of the Church and eventually became venerated as a saint. Since it was the only Christian denomination that practiced such reverence for Nestorius, the term Nestorians became commonly used as designation for adherents of the Church of the East in general, regardless of the fact that its official theological positions, finally formulated by the Babai the Great at the council of 612, was distinctive both in essence and terminology.

Throughout the medieval and early modern periods, the practice of labeling Syriac Christians of the Church of the East as "Nestorians" persisted among other Christian denominations, and even entered the terminology of Islamic scholars. Because of that, a specific duality was created within the Church of the East: reverence for Nestorius as a saint persisted, but Nestorian label was resisted if used as a derogatory term by opponents. In modern times, those questions were reexamined and reevaluated by scholars, who argued against improper uses of the term, and that position was also reflected in modern inter-denominational terminology, that avoids the use of any controversial terms. David Wilmshurst noted that for centuries "the word 'Nestorian' was used both as a term of abuse by those who disapproved of the traditional East Syrian theology, as a term of pride by many of its defenders [...] and as a neutral and convenient descriptive term by others. Nowadays it is generally felt that the term carries a stigma". Referring to the same issues, Sebastian Brock noted: "the association between the Church of the East and Nestorius is of a very tenuous nature, and to continue to call that Church 'Nestorian' is, from a historical point of view, totally misleading and incorrect – quite apart from being highly offensive and a breach of ecumenical good manners".

To designate converts from Nestorianism to Catholicism, some early western researchers have coined the term "Catholic Nestorians", but that combination was criticized as contradictory. The term occurred in works of several researchers.

=== Ritual distinctions ===
In terms of liturgical (ritual) distinctions, Syriac Christians are divided into:

- Denominations of the West Syriac Rite
  - Malankara Orthodox Church
  - Maronite Catholic Church
  - Syriac Catholic Church
  - Syriac Orthodox Church, including
    - Syriac Orthodox Church in India
  - Malabar Independent Syrian Church
  - Malankara Mar Thoma Syrian Church
  - Syro-Malankara Catholic Church
- Denominations of the East Syriac Rite
  - Ancient Church of the East
  - Assyrian Church of the East
  - Assyrian Evangelical Church
  - Assyrian Pentecostal Church
  - Chaldean Catholic Church
  - Syro-Malabar Catholic Church

== Regional terms for Syriac Christians ==
Since Syriac Christians live in various regions, both historical and modern, several terms that are generally applied to Christians of those regions are also used to designate local Syriac Christian communities. Various terminological issues, that are related to the proper use of regional and denominational designations, are often examined in scholarly literature, but some terminological issues proved to be particularly challenging for the news media.

To distinguish between regional, ethnic, linguistic and other meanings of various polysemic terms, scholars are analyzing both historical and modern aspects of their uses, but those complexities are rarely observed properly outside scholarly circles, by those who are not familiar with terminological distinctions. In the news media, Syriac Christians are often spoken of simply as Christians of their country or geographical region of residence, even when the subject of reporting is specifically related to Syriac denominations. Common terms such as: "Iraqi Christians", "Iranian Christians", "Turkish Christians", and particularly "Syrian Christians", are often used in a way that is seen by Syriac Christian communities in those countries as non-specific or even improper. Since some of those states (Syria) are officially defined as "Arab Republics", the Assyrian International News Agency interpreted the practice of regional labeling as "Arabist policy of denying Assyrian identity and claiming that Assyrians, including Chaldeans and Syriacs, are Arab Christian minorities".

=== Syrian designations ===
In modern English language, "Syrian" designations are most commonly used in relation to the modern state of Syria, or (in historical context) to the region of Syria. In accordance with that, English term "Syrian Christians" is commonly used to designate Christians of Syria in general, but the same term was also used to designate Christians of "Syrian" (Syriac) rites, regardless of their regional affiliation. Because of that, the distinctive term "Syriac" was introduced and favored by some scholars to designate the Syriac branch of Eastern Christianity, thus reducing Syrian designations to their primary (regional) meanings, related to Syria. Terminological transition from "Syrian" to "Syriac" designations is implemented gradually, primarily in scholarly literature, but duality of forms still persists, even in some modern scholarly works, thus resulting in a continuous variety of parallel uses (Syriac Christianity/Syrian Christianity, Christian Syriacs/Christian Syrians, East Syriac Rite/East Syrian Rite, West Syriac Rite/West Syrian Rite).

Syrian designations in particular may be confusing for an outsider, since someone may self-identify as both Syrian and Syriac. For example, Syriac Orthodox Christians from modern Syria are "Syriacs" as members of the Syriac Orthodox Church, but also "Syrians" as inhabitants of Syria. Since the historical region of Syria was much wider than modern Syria, in various writings related to earlier historical periods Syriac Christians could also be termed both as "Syriacs" by rite, and "Syrians" by region, even if their homelands are located outside the borders of modern Syria, but do belong within borders of the historical region of Syria. One of the most notable example is related to the city of Antioch on the Orontes, that was historical seat of the Patriarchate of Antioch and the capital city of Roman Syria, but since 1939 became part of modern Turkey. Therefore, earlier history of Syriac Christianity in such regions belongs to the Syrian regional history, but since those regions are now in Turkey, their heritage also belongs to the history of Christianity in Turkey.

In India, term "Syrian Christians" is still used as one of main designations for Saint Thomas Christians, who are traditionally using Syriac rites and Syriac language in their liturgical practices. Some authors even consider them to be "a distinct, endomagous ethnic group, in many ways similar to a caste. They have a history of close to two thousand years, and in language, religion, and ethnicity, they are related to Persian as well as West Syrian Christian traditions".

In recent years, English terminology (based on Syrian/Syriac distinctions) was made even more complicated, since several modern authors started to favor exonymic Turkish term Süryânî, by using it in texts written in English language, and thus promoting additional term for Syriac Christians. The term "Süryânî" itself has previously been a focal point of dispute between Assyrian and Aramean identities. The Oxford Turkish Dictionary translates the Turkish "Süryani" as meaning "Syrian Christian" and "Syriac", and recent English sources have favored using the label in correlation with Syriac/Syrian or to offer a neutral description of Assyrians. The term is also typically used to refer to Syriac Orthodox Christians. Previously, several written sources discussing Assyrians in Turkey have previously used Suryani as a label identifying Assyrian ethnicity. Turkish sources, including those from the government of Turkey, have also translated Süryani as Assyrian. Donabed has previously written that Assyrian identity was attested amongst the same Syriac Orthodox Christians before the application of Nestorian by Protestant missionaries, and that "Süryani", alongside "Süryani Qadim", "Assori", "Suryoye" and "Othuroye" were used interchangeably to refer to the same people. According to Syriac priest Gabriel Aydin, the name Assyria would spread to the region of the Greeks, where by adding the letter Y to the end and eliminating the A at the front, the word Süryani was formed alongside Süryan, Suroyo, and Suryoye.

Some similar questions arose in regard to the use of Assyrian designations as regional terms. John Joseph stated that in the English terminology of the 19th century, term "Assyrian Christians" initially designated Christians of geographical Assyria, but later transformed into 'Christian Assyrians'", thus gaining ethnic connotations, and also cited James Coakley, who remarked that "the link created between the modern 'Assyrians' and the ancient Assyrians of Nineveh known to readers of the Old Testament [...] has proved irresistible to the imagination".

== Ethnic terms for Syriac Christians ==
Gradual decline of Aramaic-speaking communities in the Near East, from the 1st century CE, down to the modern times

Remaining communities of Neo-Aramaic speakers in the modern Near East

Since Syriac Christians belong to various ethnic groups, native to the Near East and India, and also spread throughout diaspora, several terms that are applied to those groups are also used to designate Syriac Christian communities that belong to distinctive ethnicities.

Various groups among modern Syriac Christians of the Near East derive and uphold their ethnic identities by claiming descendancy from peoples of the Ancient Near East, such as: ancient Arameans, ancient Assyrians, ancient Chaldeans, and ancient Phoenicians. Since ethnic composition of the Near East suffered many substantial and successive changes during ancient, medieval, and modern times, all questions related to ethnic continuity are not only viewed as complex, but also treated as highly sensitive. Some of those questions proved to be very challenging, not only for distinctive communities and their mutual relations, but also for scholars from several fields related to the study of Syriac Christianity.

A common cultural denominator for all communities of Syriac Christians is found in the use of Aramaic languages, both historical (Edessan Aramaic: Classical Syriac) and modern (Neo-Aramaic languages), acknowledging in the same time, within the bounds of mutually shared cultural heritage, that ancient Aramaic language was accepted as lingua franca during the final two centuries of the Neo-Assyrian Empire.

A simplified list presents various self-identifications among modern Syriac Christians of the Near East, with regard to their ethnic or ethno-religious identity (in alphabetical order):

- Arameans (mostly endorsed by adherents of the Syriac Orthodox Church, and also by some in the Syriac Catholic Church and the Maronite Catholic Church)
- Assyrians (endorsed mostly by adherents of the Assyrian Church of the East, and the Ancient Church of the East, and also by some in the Chaldean Catholic Church and the Syriac Orthodox Church)
- Chaldeans (endorsed mostly by adherents of the Chaldean Catholic Church)
- Phoenicians (endorsed by some in the Maronite Catholic Church, mainly in Lebanon)
- Syriacs (mostly endorsed as a distinctive ethnic identity by some in the Syriac Orthodox Church, and also by some in the Syriac Catholic Church)

=== Ethnic identity disputes ===
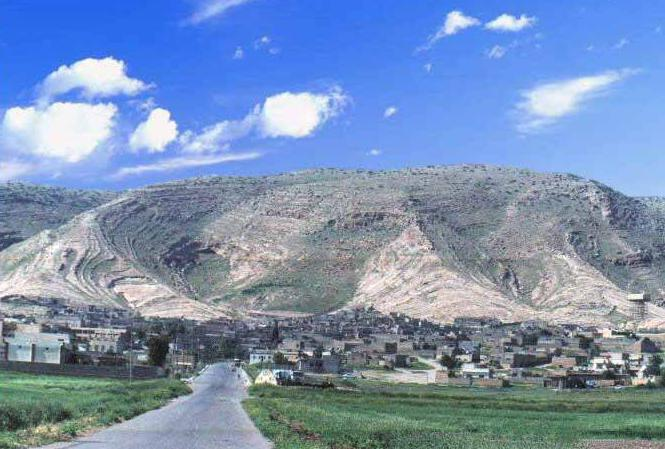
Alqosh, located in the midst of a contemporary ethnically Assyrian community

One of the main questions, related to ethnic identity of modern Syriac Christians of the Near East, stems from a dispute between two conflicting and mutually exclusive claims:

- Pan-ethnic claim: All of modern Syriac Christians of the Near East share the same ethnicity, and thus should be united under a single name.
- Poly-ethnic claim: Modern Syriac Christians of the Near East are divided into several, mutually distinctive ethnicities, each having its own name.

Proponents of pan-ethnic claims are further divided in two radicalized groups, that are mutually adversarial, and also deeply invested into mutual denialism:

- those who favor Pan-Aramean ethnic identity claim that all Aramaic-speakers are ethnic Arameans, thus denying the validity of all other competing identities, with particular focus on the denial of any Assyrian continuity. Pan-Aramean views are advocated by some activists, who are working mainly within Aramean ethnic and political organizations, such as the World Council of Arameans, and the Aramean Democratic Organization.
- those who favor Pan-Assyrian ethnic identity claim that all Aramaic-speakers are ethnic Assyrians, thus denying the validity of all other competing identities, with particular focus on the denial of a distinctive Chaldean ethnicity and Aramean continuity. Pan-Assyrian views are supported by Finnish scholar Simo Parpola, who stated in 2004: "In this context it is important to draw attention to the fact that the Aramaic-speaking peoples of the Near East have since ancient times identified themselves as Assyrians and still continue to do so", thus affirming his general pan-Assyrian positions within the wider field of Assyriology. In general, modern Assyrian identity and Assyrian continuity is well supported by Assyriologists, and those who argue for a pan-Aramean identity are usually treated as Assyrians by international organizations, or left neutral through a multi-name designation.

Contrary to radical pan-Aramean and pan-Assyrian claims, various proponents of poly-ethnic views are focused mainly on their own communities, recognizing at the same time the equality of other communities and the validity of their self-designations, thus creating a base for mutual acknowledgment and toleration. Advocates of such views are found in all groups, among moderate Arameans, Assyrians, Chaldeans and others. Prominent Assyrian scholar, professor Amir Harrak, who supports Assyrian continuity that is based on historical traditions of Assyrian heartlands, also acknowledges Aramean continuity that is based on similar historical traditions of some other (western) regions, thus demonstrating a balanced and moderate approach to those sensitive issues.

Most who support such poly-ethnic approach are ready to accept traditional "Syriac" designation as a cultural umbrella term, but without any suppression of distinctive ethnic identities. Thus, the term "Syriac peoples" (in plural) would designate a poly-ethnic group that includes distinctive peoples such as: modern Arameans, modern Assyrians, modern Chaldeans, and others. Such poly-ethnic pan-Syriac views are endorsed by some organizations, such as the European Syriac Union.

Similar preferences for the use of Syrian/Syriac designations as unifying terms were also manifested during the formative stages of national awakening, at the beginning of the 20th century. In 1910, Nestorius Malech (d. 1927) edited and published a work of his late father George Malech (d. 1909), that contained a chapter under the title: "The Arameans, Chaldeans, Assyrians and Syrians are One Nation and their Language is One". In order to explain the nature of those terms, the authors also claimed: "These four names are not national, but geographical significations". Emphasizing the common use of "Syrian language" among all those groups, the authors also advocated for the acknowledgement of a common "Syrian nation".

Such ideas, based on the use of "Syrian" designations, lost their practicality soon after 1918, when the foundations of modern Syria were laid, thus giving a distinctive geopolitical meaning to Syrian appellations, that became firmly tied to a country whose population was consisted mainly of Muslim Arabs. Later attempts to employ slightly distinctive Syriac designations came from foreign terminology, since native language had only one principal and widely accepted form (Suryaye/Suryoye) that simply meant: Syrians, and it took almost a century to accept Syrian/Syriac distinctions, but only in cases when self-designations are expressed in foreign languages. Thus became acceptable to use terms like: Syriac Christianity, Syriac language, Syriac literature, and Syriacs in general, but traditional native appellations (Suryaye/Suryoye) remained unchanged.

Views on endonymic (native) designations are also divided. Aramean activists are endorsing two terms: Ārāmayē (ܐܪܡܝܐ) and Sūryāyē (ܣܘܪܝܝܐ), but they are emphasizing that the second term was historically accepted as an alternative self-identification only since the 5th century CE, under the influence of Greek terminology. Assyrian activists are endorsing the term Āṯūrāyē (ܐܬܘܪܝܐ), and also accept the term Sūryāyē (ܣܘܪܝܝܐ), but they claim that it always represented just a slightly shortened form of the main designation for Assyrians. In the Assyrian Neo-Aramaic language, both terms are thus used: Āṯūrāyē ("Assyrians") and Sūrāyē/Sūryāyē ("Syrians/Syriacs").

Disputes over ethnic identity began to intensify during the 1970s and gradually escalated to the point of mutual animosity that attracted the attention of foreign scholars and international institutions. Mutual denialism, particularly between radicalized proponents of pan-Aramean and pan-Assyrian claims, was perceived as being at odds with internationally endorsed principles, based on the notion that every ethnic community should be respected and allowed to choose its own self-designation. By the beginning of the 21st century, foreign scholars and institutions have shown an increasing tendency of taking neutral positions, that also affected terminology. Several attempts were made to create acceptable compound terms, by using various combinations of basic terms for Arameans, Assyrians, Chaldeans, and Syriacs in general. Some of those solutions were applied in the US census ("Assyrian/Chaldean/Syriac"), and in the Swedish census ("Assyrier/Syrianer").

Additional distinctions also appeared in regard to some other issues. Unlike the Assyrians, who emphasize their non-Arab ethnicity and have historically sought a state of their own, some urban Chaldean Catholics are more likely to assimilate into Arab identity. Other Chaldeans, particularly in America, identify with the ancient Chaldeans of Chaldea rather than the Assyrians. In addition, while Assyrians self-define as a strictly Christian nation, Aramaic organizations generally accept that Muslim Arameans also exist, and that many Muslims in historic Aramea were converts (forced or voluntary) from Christianity to Islam. An exception to the near-extinction of Western Aramaic are the Lebanese Maronite speakers of Western Neo-Aramaic; however, they largely self-identify as the Phoenicians (the ancient people of Lebanon) and not Arameans. Some Muslim Lebanese nationalists espouse Phoenician identity as well.

=== Assyria-Syria naming controversy ===
The question of ethnic identity and self-designation is sometimes connected to the scholarly debate on the etymology of "Syria". The question has a long history of academic controversy.

The terminological problem dates from the Seleucid Empire (323–150 BC), which applied the term Syria, the Greek and Indo-Anatolian form of the name Assyria, which had existed even during the Assyrian Empire, not only to the homeland of the Assyrians but also to lands to the west in the Levant, previously known as Aramea, Eber Nari and Phoenicia (modern Syria, Lebanon and northern Israel) that later became part of the empire. This caused not only the original Assyrians, but also the ethnically and geographically distinct Arameans and Phoenicians of the Levant to be collectively called Syrians and Syriacs in the Greco-Roman world.

The 1997 discovery of the Çineköy inscription appears to prove conclusively that the term Syria was derived from the Assyrian term 𒀸𒋗𒁺 𐎹 Aššūrāyu., and referred to Assyria and Assyrian. The Çineköy inscription is a Hieroglyphic Luwian-Phoenician bilingual, uncovered from Çineköy, Adana Province, Turkey (ancient Cilicia), dating to the 8th century BCE. Originally published by Tekoglu and Lemaire (2000), it was more recently analyzed by historian Robert Rollinger, who lend a strong support to the age-old debate of the name "Syria" being derived from "Assyria" (see Name of Syria).

The examined section of the Luwian inscription reads:

§VI And then, the/an Assyrian king (su+ra/i-wa/i-ni-sa(URBS)) and the whole Assyrian "House" (su+ra/i-wa/i-za-ha(URBS)) were made a fa[ther and a mo]ther for me,
§VII and Hiyawa and Assyria (su+ra/i-wa/i-ia-sa-ha(URBS)) were made a single "House".

The corresponding Phoenician inscription reads:

And the king [of Aššur and (?)]
the whole "House" of Aššur ('ŠR) were for me a father [and a]
mother, and the DNNYM and the Assyrians ('ŠRYM)

The object on which the inscription is found is a monument belonging to Urikki, vassal king of Hiyawa (i.e. Cilicia), dating to the 8th century BC. In this monumental inscription, Urikki made reference to the relationship between his kingdom and his Assyrian overlords. The Luwian inscription reads "Sura/i" whereas the Phoenician translation reads 'ŠR or "Ashur" which, according to Rollinger (2006), settles the problem once and for all.

Some scholars in the past rejected the theory of 'Syrian' being derived from 'Assyrian' as "naive" and based purely on onomastic similarity in Indo-European languages, until the inscription identified the origins of this derivation.

In Classical Greek usage, terms Syria and Assyria were used interchangeably. Herodotus's distinctions between the two in the 5th century BCE were a notable early exception. Randolph Helm emphasizes that Herodotus "never" applied the term Syria to Mesopotamia, which he always called "Assyria", and used "Syria" to refer to inhabitants of the coastal Levant. While himself maintaining a distinction, Herodotus also claimed that "those called Syrians by the Hellenes (Greeks) are called Assyrians by the barbarians (non-Greeks).

Greek geographer and historian Strabo (d. in 24 CE) described, in his "Geography", both Assyria and Syria, dedicating specific chapters to each of them, but also noted, in his chapter on Assyria:

Those who have written histories of the Syrian empire say that when the Medes were over thrown by the Persians, and the Syrians by the Medes, they spoke of the Syrians only as those who built the palaces at Babylon and Ninos. Of these, Ninos founded Ninos in Atouria, and his wife Semiramis succeeded her husband and founded Babylon ... The city of Ninos was destroyed immediately after the overthrow of the Syrians. It was much greater than Babylon and was situated in the plain of Atouria.

Throughout his work, Strabo used terms Atouria (Assyria) and Syria (and also terms Assyrians and Syrians) in relation to specific terminological questions, while comparing and analyzing views of previous writers. Reflecting on the works of Poseidonius (d. 51 BCE), Strabo noted:

For the people of Armenia, the Syrians, and the Arabians display a great racial kinship, both in their language and their lives and physical characteristics, particularly where they are adjacent ... Considering the latitudes, there is a great difference between those toward the north and south and the Syrians in the middle, but common condition s prevail, [C42] and the Assyrians and Arimanians somewhat resemble both each other and the others. He [Poseidonios] infers that the names of these peoples are similar to each other, for those whom we call Syrians are called Aramaians by the Syrians themselves, and there is a resemblance between this [name], and that of the Armenians, Arabians, and Erembians.

In the 1st century AD, Jewish historian Flavius Josephus wrote about various peoples who were descended from the Sons of Noah, according to Biblical tradition, and noted that: "Assyras founded the city of Ninus, and gave his name to his subjects, the Assyrians, who rose to the height of prosperity. Arphaxades named those under his rule Arphaxadaeans, the Chaldaeans of to-day. Aramus ruled the Aramaeans, whom the Greeks term Syrians". Those remarks testify that Josephus regarded all these peoples (Assyrians, Chaldeans, Arameans) as his contemporaries, thus confirming that in his time non-of those peoples were considered as extinct.

"Syria" and "Assyria" were not fully distinguished by Greeks until they became better acquainted with the Near East. Under Macedonian rule after Syria's conquest by Alexander the Great, "Syria" was restricted to the land west of the Euphrates. Likewise, the Romans clearly distinguished the Assyria and Syria.

Unlike the Indo-European languages, the native Semitic name for Syria has always been distinct from Assyria. During the Akkadian Empire (2335–2154 BC), Neo-Sumerian Empire (2119–2004 BC) and Old Assyrian Empire (1975–1750 BC) the region which is now Syria was called The Land of the Amurru and Mitanni, referring to the Amorites and the Hurrians. Beginning from the Middle Assyrian Empire (1365–1020 BC), and also in the Neo Assyrian Empire (935–605 BC) and the succeeding Neo-Babylonian Empire (605–539 BC) and Achaemenid Empire (539–323 BC), Syria was known as Aramea and later Eber Nari. The term Syria emerged only during the 9th century BC, and was only used by Indo-Anatolian and Greek speakers, and solely in reference to Assyria.

According to Tsereteli, the Georgian equivalent of "Assyrians" appears in ancient Georgian, Armenian and Russian documents, making the argument that the nations and peoples to the east and north of Mesopotamia knew the group as Assyrians, while to the West, beginning with Luwian, Hurrian and later Greek influence, the Assyrians were known as Syrians.

=== Ethnic identities ===
==== Assyrian identity ====
Assyrian flag (since 1968)

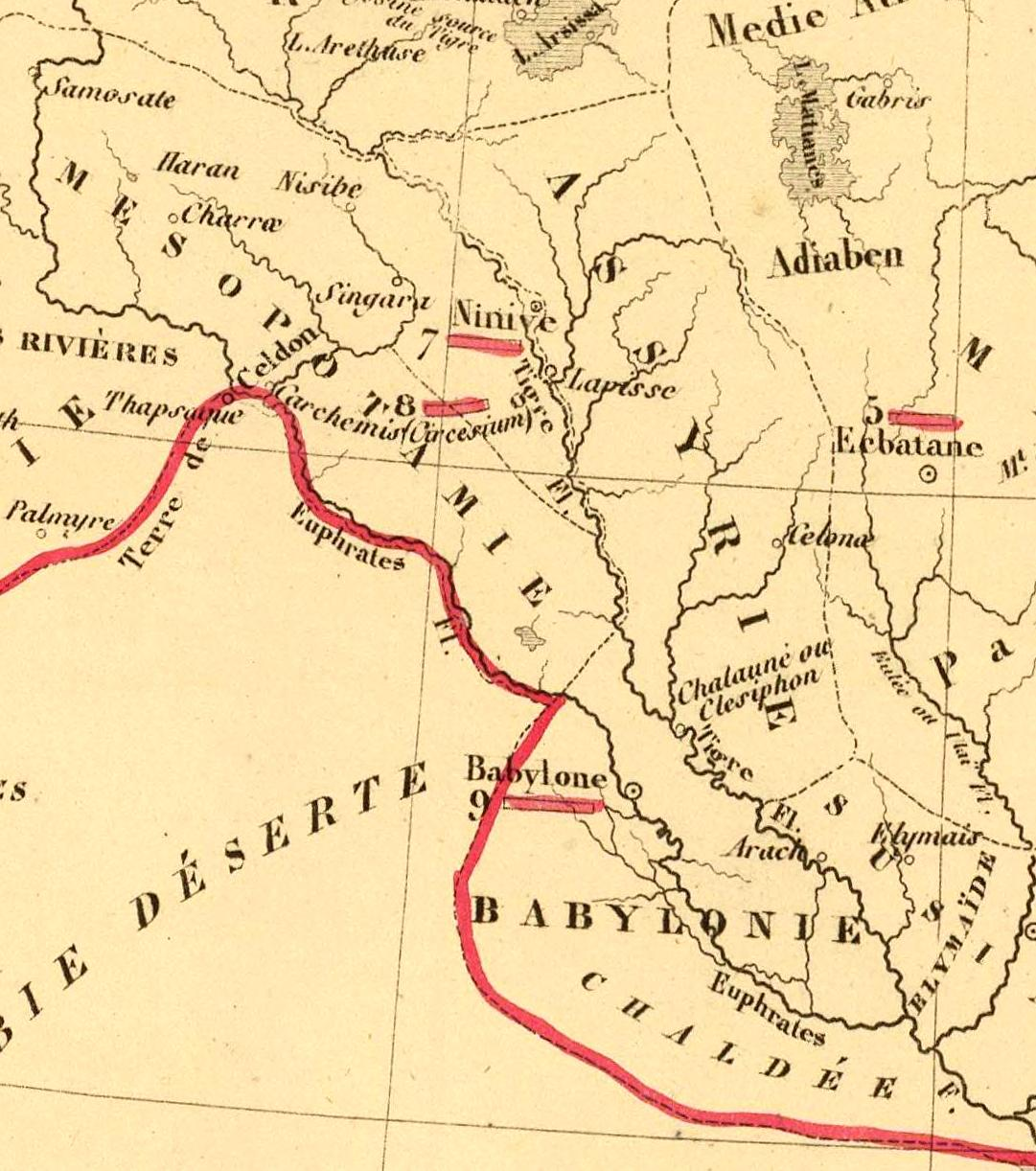
Assyria under the Persian Empire

An Assyrian identity is today maintained by followers of the Assyrian Church of the East, the Ancient Church of the East, the Chaldean Catholic Church, Syriac Orthodox Church, Assyrian Pentecostal Church, Assyrian Evangelical Church, and to a much lesser degree the Syriac Catholic Church. Those identifying with Assyria, and with Mesopotamia in general, tend to be Mesopotamian Eastern Aramaic speaking Christians from northern Iraq, north eastern Syria, south eastern Turkey and north west Iran, together with communities that spread from these regions to neighbouring lands such as Armenia, Georgia, southern Russia, Azerbaijan and the Western World.

The Assyrianist movement originated in the 19th to early 20th centuries, in direct opposition to Pan-Arabism and in the context of Assyrian irredentism. It was exacerbated by the Assyrian genocide and Assyrian War of Independence of World War I. The emphasis of Assyrian antiquity grew ever more pronounced in the decades following World War II, with an official Assyrian calendar introduced in the 1950s, taking as its era the year 4750 BC, the purported date of foundation of the city of Assur and the introduction of a new Assyrian flag in 1968. Assyrians tend to be from Iraq, Iran, southeast Turkey, northeast Syria, Armenia, Georgia, southern Russia and Azerbaijan, as well as in diaspora communities in the US, Canada, Australia, Great Britain, Sweden, Netherlands etc.

Assyrian continuity, embodied in the idea that the modern Assyrians are descended from the ancient Assyrians, is also supported by several western scholars, including: Henry Saggs, Robert Biggs, John Brinkman, Simo Parpola, and Richard Frye. It is denied by historian John Joseph, himself a modern Assyrian, and Semitologist Aaron Michael Butts.

Eastern Syriac Christians are on record, but only from the late nineteenth century, calling themselves Aturaye, Assyrians, and the region now in Iraq, northeast Syria and southeast Turkey was still known as Assyria (Athura, Assuristan) until the 7th century AD.

Christian missionary Horatio Southgate (d. 1894), who travelled through Mesopotamia and encountered various groups of indigenous Christians, stated in 1840 that Chaldeans consider themselves to be descended from Assyrians, but he also recorded that the same Chaldeans hold that Jacobites are descended from those ancient Syrians whose capital city was Damascus. Referring to Chaldean views, Southgate stated:

Those of them who profess to have any idea concerning their origin, say, that they are descended from the Assyrians, and the Jacobites from the Syrians, whose chief city was Damascus

Rejecting assumptions of Asahel Grant, who claimed (in 1841) that modern Nestorians and other Christian groups of Mesopotamia are descendants of ancient Jewish tribes, Southgate remarked (in 1842):

The Syrians are remarkably strict in the observance of the Sabbath as a day of rest, and this is one of a multitude of resemblances between them and the Jews. There are some of these resemblances which are more strongly marked among the Syrians than among the Nestorians, and yet the Syrians are undoubtedly descendants of the Assyrians, and not of the Jews

Southgate visited Christian communities of the Near East sometime before the ancient Assyrian sites were rediscovered by western archaeologists, and in 1844 he published additional remarks on local traditions of ancient ancestry:

At the Armenian village of Arpaout, where I stopped for breakfast, I began to make inquiries for the Syrians. The people informed me that there were about one hundred families of them in the town of Kharpout, and a village inhabited by them on the plain. I observed that the Armenians did not know them under the name which I used, Syriani; but called them Assouri, which struck me the more at the moment from its resemblance to our English name Assyrians, from whom they claim their origin, being sons, as they say, of Assour (Asshur)

It's from the remarks of Horatio Southgate that the Armenian "Asori" (Armenian: ասորի), which in Classical Armenian is derived from the Akkadian "Assur" (Akkadian: 𒀸𒋩𒆠), has been noted and analyzed by several scholars, in relation to their significance for the question of Assyrian continuity. The Armenian Base Form Dictionary of the University of Texas at Austin defines "Asori" as meaning Assyrian and "Syrian" based on the writings of Movses Khorenatsi, and the label was translated as Assyrian from several Armenian language dictionaries. In a 2025 presentation at Yerevan State University, Dr. Nicholas Al-Jeloo noted that the Armenian "Asorakan" (Armenian: ասորական) is simultaneously used to refer to the Syriac Orthodox Church and the Assyrian Church of the East, and that Asori didn't refer to the ancient Arameans until the Syriac Orthodox Church began a shift in names during the 1950s.

Criticisms of the Armenian "Asori" exist from those who support Aramean identity, suggesting that the interpretation of "Asori" as Assyrian is made by those who lack understanding in the Armenian language. Some authors have noted that in the language of Southgate's Armenian informers, the term Assouri (Asori) would designate Syrians in general, while an Armenian specific term for "Assyrians" would be Asorestantsi. Such views were criticized by other authors. Noting that Southgate's reports do not state that Syriac Jacobites self‐identified as Assyrians, some authors have pointed out that Southgate himself did accept such notions, in opposition to Grant's theories. Systematic use of "Assyrian" designations for Syriac Christians gained wider acceptance in the context of later Protestant missions in the region, particularly after the establishment of the Archbishop of Canterbury's Mission to the Assyrian Christians (1886), that avoided the term "Nestorians" for adherents of the Church of the East.

==== Chaldean identity ====
What is now known to be Biblical Aramaic was until the second half of the 19th century called "Chaldean" (Chaldaic, or Chaldee), and East Syriac Christians, whose liturgical language was and is a form of Aramaic, were called Chaldeans, as an ethnic, not a religious term. Hormuzd Rassam applied the term "Chaldeans" to the "Nestorians", those not in communion with Rome, no less than to the Catholics. He stated that "the present Chaldeans, with a few exceptions, speak the same dialect used in the Targum, and in some parts of Ezra and Daniel, which are called 'Chaldee'."

In western terminology, the term "Chaldeans" was used in the 15th century, as designation for a group of Eastern Christians in Cyprus, who originally descended from Mesopotamia, and entered an ephemeral union with the Catholic Church in 1445, and later for those who entered into communion with the Catholic Church in their ancestral regions, between the 16th and 18th centuries.

Until at least the mid-nineteenth century, the name "Chaldean" was the ethnic name for all the area's Christians, whether in or out of communion with Rome. William F. Ainsworth, whose visit was in 1840, spoke of the non-Catholics as "Chaldeans" and of the Catholics as "Roman-Catholic Chaldeans". For those Chaldeans who retained their ancient faith, Ainsworth also stated that the name "Nestorians" was applied to them since 1681, to distinguish them from those in communion with Rome. A little later, Austen Henry Layard also used the term "Chaldean" even for those he also called Nestorians. The same term had earlier been used by Richard Simon in the seventeenth century, writing: "Among the several Christian sects in the Middle East that are called Chaldeans or Syrians, the most sizeable is that of the Nestorians". As indicated above, Horatio Southgate, who said that the members of the Syriac Orthodox Church (West Syrians) considered themselves descendants of Asshur, the second son of Shem, called the members of the divided Church of the East Chaldeans and Papal Chaldeans.

In 1875, Henry Van-Lennep stated that the term "Chaldean Church" is a "generic name" for Christian "Assyrians". Thus, speaking of the Nestorian Schism of 431, that occurred many centuries before the division of the Church of the East into those who accepted and those who rejected communion with the Catholic Church, he wrote: "At the schism on account of Nestorius, the Assyrians, under the generic name of the Chaldean Church, mostly separated from the orthodox Greeks, and, being under the rule of the Persians, were protected against persecution".

Although it was only towards the end of the 19th century that the term "Assyrian" became accepted, largely through the influence of the Archbishop of Canterbury's Mission to the Assyrian Christians, at first as a replacement for the term "Nestorian", but later as an ethnic description, today even members of the Chaldean Catholic Church, such as Raphael Bidawid, patriarch of the Chaldean Catholic Church from 1989 to 2003, accept "Assyrian" as an indication of nationality, while "Chaldean" has for them become instead an indication of religious confession. He stated: "When a portion of the Church of the East became Catholic in the 17th Century, the name given was 'Chaldean' based on the Magi kings who were believed by some to have come from what once had been the land of the Chaldean, to Bethlehem. The name 'Chaldean' does not represent an ethnicity, just a church... We have to separate what is ethnicity and what is religion... I myself, my sect is Chaldean, but ethnically, I am Assyrian". Before becoming patriarch, he said in an interview with the Assyrian Star newspaper: "Before I became a priest I was an Assyrian, before I became a bishop I was an Assyrian, I am an Assyrian today, tomorrow, forever, and I am proud of it".

That was a sea change from the earlier situation, when "Chaldean" was a self-description by prelates not in communion with Rome: "Nestorian patriarchs occasionally used 'Chaldean' in formal documents, claiming to be the 'real Patriarchs' of the whole 'Chaldean Church'." Nestorian Christians who "denied that Mary was the Mother of God and claimed that Christ existed in two persons. They consecrated leavened bread and used the 'Chaldean' (Syriac) language".

Hannibal Travis states that, in recent times, a small and mainly United States-based minority within the Chaldean Catholic Church have begun to espouse a separate Chaldean ethnic identity.

In 2005, the new Constitution of Iraq recognized Chaldeans as a distinctive community (Article 125). In 2017, the Chaldean Catholic Church issued an official statement of its Synod of Bishops, reafirming its commitment to a distinctive Chaldean identity:

"As a genuine Chaldean people, we officially reject the labels that distort our Chaldean identity, such as the composite name "Chaldean Syriac Assyrian" used in the Kurdistan Region, contrary to the name established in the Iraqi constitution. We call upon our daughters and sons to reject these labels, to adhere to their Chaldean identity without fanaticism, and to respect the other names such as 'Assyrians', 'Syriacs', and 'Armenians'."

==== Chaldo-Assyrian identity ====
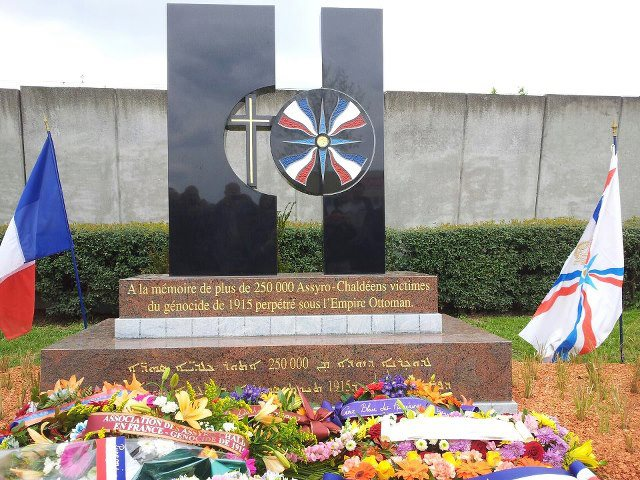
Memorial of the Seyfo genocide, in Paris, with commemorative inscription using composite Assyro-Chaldean designation

In modern political history, some attempts were made to overcome terminological divisions by creating some new, complex terms like: Chaldo-Assyrians or Assyro-Chaldeans. Those designations were aimed to provide a composite umbrella term, that would serve as a vessel for the promotion of a unified national identity. The term "Assyro-Chaldeans", as a combination of the terms "Assyrian" and "Chaldean", was used in the Treaty of Sèvres, which spoke of "full safeguards for the protection of the Assyro-Chaldeans and other racial or religious minorities".

Soon after the implementation of political changes in Iraq, a conference was held in Baghdad on 22–24 October 2003, attended by representatives of Christian communities, both Assyrian and Chaldean, adopting a resolution that proclaimed national unity under the composite name of "ChaldoAssyrians". The proposed name was not accepted by the major political factions in Iraq. In 2005, the new Constitution of Iraq was adopted, recognising Assyrians and Chaldeans as two distinct communities (Article 125). That constitutional provision was criticized by proponents of national unity.

==== Aramean identity ====
Syriac-Aramean flag

An Aramean identity is advocated by some modern Syriac Christians, primarily adherents of the Syriac Orthodox Church and Maronites in Israel, as well as by the Western Aramaic-speaking Sunni Muslims and Melkite Christians in the towns of Maaloula and Jubb’adin in southwestern Syria. They are mainly descended from western regions of the Near East, including various parts of modern Syria, Lebanon, Palestine, and some southeastern parts of modern Turkey, but are today living in diaspora, especially in some European countries, such as Sweden, Germany, Belgium, and the Netherlands.

Modern Arameans claim to be the descendants of the ancient Arameans, who emerged in the Levant in the 12th century BCE, and formed a number of local Aramean kingdoms, that were conquered by the Neo-Assyrian Empire in the course of the 8th and the 7th centuries BCE. They preserved their ethnic and linguistic identity throughout several periods of foreign domination, and later accepted Christianity.

In English language, they self-identify as "Arameans" or "Syriacs", sometimes combining those designations in compound terms such as "Syriacs-Arameans" or "Arameans-Syriacs". In Swedish, they call themselves Syrianer, and in German, Aramäer is a common self-designation.

In 2014, Israel decided to recognize the Aramean community within its borders as a national minority (Arameans in Israel), allowing most of the Syriac Christians in Israel (around 10,000) to be registered as "Aramean" instead of "Arab".

The self-identification of some Syriac Christians as Arameans is documented in Syriac literature. Mentions include that of the poet-theologian Jacob of Serugh, (c. 451 – 29 November 521) who describes St. Ephrem the Syrian (c. 306 – 373) as "He who became a crown for the people of the Aramaeans [armāyūthā], (and) by him we have been brought close to spiritual beauty". Ephrem himself made references to Aramean origins, calling his language Aramaic, and describing Bar-Daisan (d. 222) of Edessa as "The Philosopher of the Arameans", who "made himself a laughing-stock among Arameans and Greeks". Michael the Great (d. 1199) writes of his race as that of "the Aramaeans, namely the descendants of Aram, who were called Syrians".

During Horatio Southgate's travels through Mesopotamia, he encountered indigenous Christians and stated that Chaldeans consider themselves to be descended from Assyrians, but he also recorded that the same Chaldeans hold that Jacobites are descended from ancient Syrians of Damascus: "Those of them who profess to have any idea concerning their origin, say, that they are descended from the Assyrians, and the Jacobites from the Syrians, whose chief city was Damascus".

==== Syriac identity ====
Syriac identity is manifested in several forms among modern Syriac Christians of the Near East. For some, those who self-identify as ethnic Syriacs (Suryoye) represent a distinctive ethnic group. For others, Syriacs are Arameans (from the pro-Aramean point of view), or Assyrians (from the pro-Assyrian point of view). In some communities, Syriac identity is thus closely merged with the modern Aramean identity.

Additional form of Syriac identity is manifested as a specific pan-Syriac identity, that is viewed as an all-encompassing pan-ethnic identity. Some international non-governmental organisations, such as the European Syriac Union, founded in 2004, promote the notion that such (pan-Syriac) identity represents and includes all other ethnic and ethno-religious identities, and thus unites all groups (Arameans, Assyrians, Chaldeans and others). Similar notions are supported by some political organizations, like the Syriac Union Party in Lebanon, and the Syriac Union Party in Syria, who also use Syriac designations as unifying terms.

Historically, endonymic (native) variants (Suryaya/Suryoyo) were commonly used as designations for linguistic (Syriac language), denominational (Syriac Christianity) and liturgical (Syriac rite) self-identification, thus referring to Syriac-speaking Christians of the Near East in general. In medieval times, those designations (Suryaya/Suryoyo) were often used as common terms of collective self-identification, but later emergence of modern Syria (after 1918) created some new challenges, in the fields of both regional and international terminology. In modern English terminology, term Syrians is most commonly used as a demonym for general population of the modern state of Syria. To distinguish themselves, modern Syriac Christians have thus accepted a more specific term Syriacs, that is particularly favored among adherents of the Syriac Orthodox Church and the Syriac Catholic Church. In 2000, the Holy Synod of the Syriac Orthodox Church officially recommended that in English language this church should be called "Syriac" after its official liturgical Syriac language.

==== Phoenician identity ====
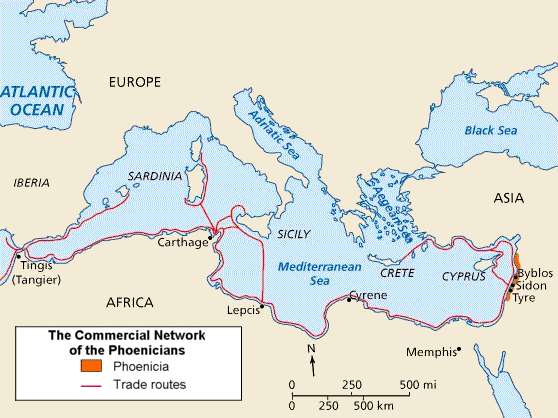
Map of Phoenicia and its Mediterranean trade routes

Many of the Catholic Maronites identify with a Phoenician origin, as do some of the Lebanese population, and do not see themselves as Assyrian, or Aramean. This comes from the fact that present day Lebanon, the Mediterranean coast of Syria, and northern Palestine is the area that roughly corresponds to ancient Phoenicia and as a result like the majority of the Lebanese people identify with the ancient Phoenician population of that region. Moreover, the cultural and linguistic heritage of the Lebanese people is a blend of both indigenous Phoenician elements and the foreign cultures that have come to rule the land and its people over the course of thousands of years. In a 2013 interview the lead investigator, Pierre Zalloua, pointed out that genetic variation preceded religious variation and divisions:"Lebanon already had well-differentiated communities with their own genetic peculiarities, but not significant differences, and religions came as layers of paint on top. There is no distinct pattern that shows that one community carries significantly more Phoenician than another."

However, a small minority of Lebanese Maronites like the Lebanese author Walid Phares tend to see themselves to be ethnic Assyrians and not ethnic Phoenicians. Walid Phares, speaking at the 70th Assyrian Convention, on the topic of Assyrians in post-Saddam Iraq, began his talk by asking why he as a Lebanese Maronite ought to be speaking on the political future of Assyrians in Iraq, answering his own question with "because we are one people. We believe we are the Western Assyrians and you are the Eastern Assyrians."

Another small minority of Lebanese Maronites like the Maronites in Israel tend to see themselves to be ethnic Arameans and not ethnic Phoenicians.

However, other Maronite factions in Lebanon, such as Guardians of the Cedars, in their opposition to Arab nationalism, advocate the idea of a pure Phoenician racial heritage (see Phoenicianism). They point out that all Lebanese people are of pre-Arab and pre-Islamic origin, and as such are at least, in part, of the Phoenician-Canaanite stock.

==== Arab identity ====
Among modern Arab Christians, several communities belong to various branches of Syriac Christianity. Historical relations between those communities and the long-standing process of Arabization in the Near East is viewed as a complex and contentious issue. The Assyrian International News Agency interpreted promotion of Arab identity among Syriac Christians as an "Arabist policy" and mentioned in particular the dedication by the American-Arab Anti-Discrimination Committee of a webpage to the Maronite Kahlil Gibran, who is "viewed in Arabic literature as an innovator, not dissimilar to someone like W. B. Yeats in the West". The vast majority of the Christians living in Israel self-identify as Arabs, but the Aramean community have wished to be recognized as a separate minority, neither Arab nor Palestinian but Aramean, while many others wish to be called Palestinian citizens of Israel rather than Arabs. The wish of the Aramean community in Israel was granted in September 2014, opening for some 200 families the possibility, if they can speak Aramaic, to register as Arameans. Other Christians in Israel criticized this move, seeing it as intended to divide the Christians and also to limit to Muslims the definition of "Arab".

==== Saint Thomas Christians of India ====
The Saint Thomas Christians of India, where they are known as Syrian Christians, though ethnically unrelated to the peoples known as Assyrian, Aramean or Syrian/Syriac, had strong cultural and religious links with Mesopotamia as a result of trade links and missionary activity by the Church of the East at the height of its influence. Following the 1653 Coonan Cross Oath, many Saint Thomas Christians passed to the Syriac Orthodox Church and later split into several distinct churches. The majority, remaining faithful to the East Syriac Rite, form the Syro-Malabar Catholic Church, from which a small group, known as the Chaldean Syrian Church, seceded and in the early 20th century linked with what is now called the Assyrian Church of the East.

=== Names in diaspora ===
==== United States ====
In the United States, adherents of the Assyrian Church of the East (who originated from the Near East) are upholding Assyrian ethnic identity, but among followers of some other communities of Syriac Christians, like those of the Chaldean Catholic Church and the Syriac Orthodox Church, there are significant internal diversities, since parts of those communities uphold the Chaldean or Syriac/Aramean identity.

Several questions related to ethnic identities of Syriac Christians were also the subject of official analyses by the United States Congressional Joint Immigration Commission and United States census authorities. In the 1980 census, Arameans and Assyrians were classified under two distinctive codes (430 and 452), while in the 1990 census, all communities, both ethnic and ethno-religious, were grouped under a single code (482).

During the 2000 United States census, Syriac Orthodox Archbishops in the US, Cyril Aphrem Karim and Clemis Eugene Kaplan, issued a declaration that their preferred English designation is "Syriacs". Within the official census classification, a specific solution was implemented by grouping all communities under a composite designation "Assyrian/Chaldean/Syriac". That decision was not welcomed by some Assyrian-American organizations, who sued the United States Census Bureau, but lost the case. Some Maronite Christians also joined this US census (as opposed to Lebanese American).

==== Sweden ====
In Sweden, adherents of the Assyrian Church of the East uphold the Assyrian identity, but among adherents of the Syriac Orthodox Church, who emigrated mainly from the Turkey during the 1960s, 1970s and 1980s, internal disputes arose over the question of ethnic identity. Those among them, who preferred the indigenous designation "Suryoyo" in Swedish as well, later came to be known as "Syrianer" in Swedish). Among "Syrianer", Aramean identity is usually also advocated. One consequence of this problem lead to the Syriac Orthodox Church creating two parallel jurisdictions in Sweden (1994), one for Syriacs-Arameans, and other for Assyrians. When referring to the community, Swedish authorities use the double term assyrier/syrianer.

== See also ==
- Assyrians
- Assyrian continuity
- Assyrian nationalism
- Assyrian homeland
- Assyria
- Syria (region)
- Name of Syria
- Çineköy inscription
- Arameans
- Aram (region)
- Phoenicianism
- Chaldea
- Babylonia
- Mesopotamia
- Neo-Aramaic languages

== General sources ==
- Abouzayd, Shafiq (2019). "The Maronite Church". The Syriac World. London: Routledge. pp. 731–750. ISBN 978-1-138-89901-8.
- Ainsworth, William F. (1841). "An Account of a Visit to the Chaldeans, Inhabiting Central Kurdistán; And of an Ascent of the Peak of Rowándiz (Ṭúr Sheïkhíwá) in Summer in 1840". The Journal of the Royal Geographical Society of London. 11: 21–76. doi:10.2307/1797632. JSTOR 1797632.
- Ainsworth, William F. (1842a). Travels and Researches in Asia Minor, Mesopotamia, Chaldea and Armenia. Vol. 1. London: John W. Parker.
- Ainsworth, William F. (1842b). Travels and Researches in Asia Minor, Mesopotamia, Chaldea and Armenia. Vol. 2. London: John W. Parker.
- Akgündüz, Emrullah (2012). "Some Notes on the Syriac Christians of Diyarbekir in the Late 19th Century: A Preliminary Investigation of Some Primary Sources". Social Relations in Ottoman Diyarbekir, 1870–1915. Leiden-Boston: Brill. pp. 217–240. ISBN 978-90-04-22518-3.
- Albrecht, Susanne (1992). "Syrian-Orthodox Christians in the Federal Republic of Germany: In Search of Identity". Proceedings of the XXXII International Congress for Asian and North African Studies. Stuttgart: Franz Steiner. pp. 294–297. ISBN 978-3-515-04808-8.
- Al-Jeloo, Nicholas (1999). "Who are the Assyrians?". The Assyrian Australian Academic Journal. 4.
- Andersson, Stefan (1983). Assyrierna: En bok om präster och lekmän, om politik och diplomati kring den assyriska invandringen till Sverige. Stockholm: Tiden. ISBN 978-91-550-2913-5.
- Andrade, Nathanael J. (2013). Syrian Identity in the Greco-Roman World. Cambridge: Cambridge University Press. ISBN 978-1-107-24456-6.
- Andrade, Nathanael J. (2011). "Framing the Syrian of Late Antiquity: Engagements with Hellenism". Journal of Modern Hellenism. 28 (2010-2011): 1–46.
- Andrade, Nathanael J. (2014). "Assyrians, Syrians and the Greek Language in the late Hellenistic and Roman Imperial Periods". Journal of Near Eastern Studies. 73 (2): 299–317. doi:10.1086/677249. JSTOR 10.1086/677249. S2CID 163755644.
- Andrade, Nathanael J. (2019). "Syriac and Syrians in the Later Roman Empire: Questions of Identity". The Syriac World. London: Routledge. pp. 157–174. doi:10.4324/9781315708195-15.
- Atto, Naures (2011a). Hostages in the Homeland, Orphans in the Diaspora: Identity Discourses Among the Assyrian/Syriac Elites in the European Diaspora. Leiden: Leiden University Press. ISBN 978-90-8728-148-9.
- Atto, Naures (2011b). "A Flock without a Shepherd". Parole de l'Orient. 36: 191–200.
- Aydin, Edip (2000). The History of the Syriac Orthodox Church of Antioch in North America: Challenges and Opportunities. MA thesis. Crestwood, NY: Saint Vladimir's Orthodox Theological Seminary. Archived from the original on 19 April 2003.
- Aydin, Suavi; Verheij, Jelle (2012). "Confusion in the Cauldron: Some Notes on Ethno-Religious Groups, Local Powers and the Ottoman State in Diyarbekir Province, 1800–1870". Social Relations in Ottoman Diyarbekir, 1870–1915. Leiden-Boston: Brill. pp. 15–54. ISBN 978-90-04-22518-3.
- Baarda, Tijmen C. (2020). "Arabic and the Syriac Christians in Iraq: Three Levels of Loyalty to the Arabist Project (1920-1950)". Arabic and its Alternatives: Religious Minorities and their Languages in the Emerging Nation States of the Middle East (1920–1950). Leiden-Boston: Brill. pp. 143–170. doi:10.1163/9789004423220_007. ISBN 978-90-04-38269-5. S2CID 216310663.
- Badger, George Percy (1852a). The Nestorians and Their Rituals. Vol. 1. London: Joseph Masters.
- Badger, George Percy (1852b). The Nestorians and Their Rituals. Vol. 2. London: Joseph Masters. ISBN 978-0-7905-4482-3.
- Bae, Chul-hyun (2004). "Aramaic as a Lingua Franca During the Persian Empire (538-333 B.C.E.)". Journal of Universal Language. 5: 1–20. doi:10.22425/jul.2004.5.1.1.
- Bagg, Ariel M. (2017). "Assyria and the West: Syria and the Levant". A Companion to Assyria. Hoboken: John Wiley & Sons. pp. 268–274. doi:10.1002/9781118325216.CH13.
- Bakker-Kellogg, Sarah (2019). "Perforating Kinship: Syriac Christianity, Ethnicity, and Secular Legibility". Current Anthropology. 60 (4): 475–498. doi:10.1086/705233. hdl:1874/386369. S2CID 224800760.
- Baum, Wilhelm; Winkler, Dietmar W. (2003). The Church of the East: A Concise History. London-New York: Routledge-Curzon. ISBN 978-1-134-43019-2.
- Becker, Adam H. (2015). Revival and Awakening: American Evangelical Missionaries in Iran and the Origins of Assyrian Nationalism. Chicago: University of Chicago Press. ISBN 978-0-226-14531-0.
- Berntson, Martin (2003). "Assyrier eller syrianer? Om fotboll, identitet och kyrkohistoria" (PDF). Gränser: Populärvetenskapliga föreläsningar hållna under Humanistdagarna den 4–5 oktober 2003. Göteborg: Göteborgs Universitet. pp. 47–52.
- Bettany, George T. (1888). The World's Inhabitants. London-New York: Ward, Lock & Co.
- Biggs, Robert D. (2005). "My Career in Assyriology and Near Eastern Archaeology" (PDF). Journal of Assyrian Academic Studies. 19 (1): 1–23. Archived from the original (PDF) on 27 February 2008.
- Brock, Sebastian P. (1982). "Christians in the Sasanian Empire: A Case of Divided Loyalties". Studies in Church History. 18: 1–19. doi:10.1017/S0424208400016004. ISBN 978-0-631-18060-9. S2CID 163971637.
- Brock, Sebastian P. (1996). "The 'Nestorian' Church: A Lamentable Misnomer" (PDF). Bulletin of the John Rylands Library. 78 (3): 23–35. doi:10.7227/BJRL.78.3.3. Archived from the original (PDF) on 6 March 2023.
- Brock, Sebastian P. (1999a). "The Christology of the Church of the East in the Synods of the Fifth to Early Seventh Centuries: Preliminary Considerations and Materials". Doctrinal Diversity: Varieties of Early Christianity. New York and London: Garland Publishing. pp. 281–298. ISBN 978-0-8153-3071-4.
- Brock, Sebastian P. (1999b). "St. Ephrem in the Eyes of Later Syriac Liturgical Tradition" (PDF). Hugoye: Journal of Syriac Studies. 2 (1): 5–25. doi:10.31826/hug-2010-020103. S2CID 212688898.
- Brock, Sebastian P. (2006). Fire from Heaven: Studies in Syriac Theology and Liturgy. Aldershot: Ashgate. ISBN 978-0-7546-5908-2.
- Brock, Sebastian P. (2008). "The Syrian Orthodox Church in Modern History". Christianity in the Middle East: Studies in Modern History, Theology, and Politics. London: Melisende. pp. 17–38. ISBN 978-1-901764-49-9.
- Brock, Sebastian P. (2011). "Christian Palestinian Aramaic". Gorgias Encyclopedic Dictionary of the Syriac Heritage. Piscataway, NJ: Gorgias Press. pp. 96–97.
- Brock, Sebastian P. (2016). "Miaphysite, not Monophysite!". Cristianesimo Nella Storia. 37 (1): 45–52. ISBN 978-88-15-26168-7.
- Buck, Christopher G. (1996). "The Universality of the Church of the East: How Persian Was Persian Christianity?". Journal of the Assyrian Academic Society. 10 (1): 54–95.
- Butts, Aaron M. (2017). "Assyrian Christians". A Companion to Assyria. Malden: John Wiley & Sons. pp. 599–612. doi:10.1002/9781118325216.CH32. ISBN 978-1-4443-3593-4.
- Calder, Mark D. (2016). "Syrian Identity in Bethlehem: From Ethnoreligion to Ecclesiology". Iran and the Caucasus. 20 (3–4): 297–323. doi:10.1163/1573384X-20160304.
- Clements, Henry (2019). "Documenting Community in the Late Ottoman Empire". International Journal of Middle East Studies. 51 (3): 423–443. doi:10.1017/S0020743819000369. S2CID 201442968.
- Coakley, James F. (1992). The Church of the East and the Church of England: A History of the Archbishop of Canterbury's Assyrian Mission. Oxford: Clarendon Press. ISBN 978-0-19-826744-7.
- Corbon, Jean (1998). "The Churches of the Middle East: Their Origins and Identity, from their Roots in the Past to their Openness to the Present". Christian Communities in the Arab Middle East: The Challenge of the Future. Oxford: Clarendon Press. pp. 92–110. ISBN 978-0-19-829388-0.
- Dalley, Stephanie; Reyes, Andres T. (1998). "Mesopotamian Contact and Influence in the Greek World: 1. To the Persian Conquest". The Legacy of Mesopotamia. New York: Oxford University Press. pp. 85–106. ISBN 978-0-19-814946-0.
- Davies, Benjamin (1872). A Compendious and Complete Hebrew and Chaldee Lexicon to the Old Testament. London: Asher.
- Debié, Muriel (2009). "Syriac Historiography and Identity Formation". Church History and Religious Culture. 89 (1–3): 93–114. doi:10.1163/187124109X408014.
- Dick, Iganatios (2004). Melkites: Greek Orthodox and Greek Catholics of the Patriarchates of Antioch, Alexandria and Jerusalem. Roslindale, MA: Sophia Press. Archived from the original on 8 June 2023.
- Dinno, Khalid (2013). "The Syrian Orthodox Church: Name as a Marker of Identity". Parole de l'Orient. 38: 193–211.
- Donabed, Sargon G. (2003). Remnants of Heroes: The Assyrian Experience: The Continuity of the Assyrian Heritage from Kharput to New England. Chicago: Assyrian Academic Society Press. ISBN 978-0-9744450-7-6.
- Donabed, Sargon G.; Donabed, Ninos (2006). Assyrians of Eastern Massachusetts. Charleston: Arcadia Publishing. ISBN 978-0-7385-4480-9.
- Donabed, Sargon G.; Mako, Shamiran (2009). "Ethno-cultural and Religious Identity of Syrian Orthodox Christians" (PDF). Chronos: Revue d'Histoire de l'Université de Balamand. 19: 69–111.
- Donabed, Sargon G. (2012). "Rethinking Nationalism and an Appellative Conundrum: Historiography and Politics in Iraq". National Identities: Critical Inquiry into Nationhood, Politics & Culture. 14 (4): 407–431. Bibcode:2012NatId..14..407D. doi:10.1080/14608944.2012.733208. S2CID 145265726.
- Donabed, Sargon G. (2015). Reforging a Forgotten History: Iraq and the Assyrians in the Twentieth Century. Edinburgh: Edinburgh University Press. ISBN 978-0-7486-8605-6.
- Donabed, Sargon G. (2017). "Neither Syriac-speaking nor Syrian Orthodox Christians: Harput Assyrians in the United States as a Model for Ethnic Self-Categorization and Expression". Syriac in its Multi-Cultural Context. Leuven: Peeters Publishers. pp. 359–369. ISBN 978-90-429-3164-0.
- Fiey, Jean Maurice (1965). "Assyriens ou Araméens?". L'Orient Syrien. 10: 141–160.
- Frahm, Eckart (2006). "Images of Assyria in Nineteenth- and Twentieth-Century Western Scholarship". Orientalism, Assyriology and the Bible. Sheffield: Sheffield Phoenix Press. pp. 74–94.
- Frenschkowski, Marco (2019). "Are Syrians Arameans? Some Preliminary Remarks on Syriac Ethnic Identity in Late Antiquity". Research on Israel and Aram: Autonomy, Independence and Related Issues. Tübingen: Mohr Siebeck. pp. 457–484. ISBN 978-3-16-157719-2.
- Frye, Richard N. (1992). "Assyria and Syria: Synonyms". Journal of Near Eastern Studies. 51 (4): 281–285. doi:10.1086/373570. S2CID 161323237.
- Frye, Richard N. (1997). "Assyria and Syria: Synonyms" (PDF). Journal of Assyrian Academic Studies. 11 (2): 30–36. Archived from the original (PDF) on 13 July 2020.
- Frye, Richard N. (1999). "Reply to John Joseph" (PDF). Journal of Assyrian Academic Studies. 13 (1): 69–70. Archived from the original (PDF) on 11 July 2020.
- Frye, Richard N. (2002). "Mapping Assyria". Ideologies as Intercultural Phenomena. Milano: Università di Bologna. pp. 75–78. ISBN 978-88-8483-107-1.
- Fürst, Julius (1867). A Hebrew & Chaldee Lexicon to the Old Testament: With an Introduction Giving a Short History of Hebrew Lexicography. London: Williams & Norgate.
- Gaunt, David (2012). "Relations between Kurds and Syriacs and Assyrians in Late Ottoman Diyarbekir". Social Relations in Ottoman Diyarbekir, 1870–1915. Leiden-Boston: Brill. pp. 241–266. ISBN 978-90-04-22518-3.
- Gesenius, Wilhelm; Prideaux-Tregelles, Samuel (1859). Gesenius's Hebrew and Chaldee Lexicon to the Old Testament Scriptures. London: Bagster.
- Gewargis, Odisho Malko (2002). "We Are Assyrians" (PDF). Journal of Assyrian Academic Studies. 16 (1): 77–95. Archived from the original (PDF) on 21 April 2003.
- Georgis, Mariam (2017). "Nation and Identity Construction in Modern Iraq: (Re)Inserting the Assyrians". Unsettling Colonial Modernity in Islamicate Contexts. Newcastle upon Tyne: Cambridge Scholars Publishing. pp. 67–87. ISBN 978-1-4438-9374-9.
- Ginkel, Jan J. van (2005). "History and Community: Jacob of Edessa and the West Syrian Identity". Redefining Christian Identity: Cultural Interaction in the Middle East Since the Rise of Islam. Leuven: Peeters Publishers. pp. 67–75. ISBN 978-90-429-1418-6.
- Girling, Kristian (2017). The Chaldean Catholic Church: Modern History, Ecclesiology and Church-State Relations. London: Routledge. ISBN 978-1-138-04005-2.
- Grant, Asahel (1841). The Nestorians, or the Lost Tribes: Containing Evidence of Their Identity. London: John Murray.
- Griffith, Sidney H. (1997). "From Aramaic to Arabic: The Languages of the Monasteries of Palestine in the Byzantine and Early Islamic Periods". Dumbarton Oaks Papers. 51: 11–31. doi:10.2307/1291760. JSTOR 1291760.
- Griffith, Sidney H. (2002). "Christianity in Edessa and the Syriac-Speaking World: Mani, Bar Daysan, and Ephraem, the Struggle for Allegiance on the Aramean Frontier". Journal of the Canadian Society for Syriac Studies. 2: 5–20. doi:10.31826/jcsss-2009-020104. S2CID 212688584. Archived from the original on 11 December 2018.
- Gunner, Göran; Halvardson, Sven (2005). Jag behöver rötter och vingar: Om assyrisk/syriansk identitet i Sverige. Skellefteå: Artos & Normaurl. ISBN 978-91-7217-080-3.
- Haddad, Robert M. (1970). Syrian Christians in a Muslim Society: An Interpretation. Princeton, NJ: Princeton University Press. ISBN 978-1-4008-7258-9.
- Harrak, Amir (1992). "The Ancient Name of Edessa" (PDF). Journal of Near Eastern Studies. 51 (3): 209–214. doi:10.1086/373553. S2CID 162190342. Archived from the original (PDF) on 9 August 2014.
- Healey, John F. (2019). "Arameans and Aramaic in Transition – Western Influences and the Roots of Aramean Christianity". Research on Israel and Aram: Autonomy, Independence and Related Issues. Tübingen: Mohr Siebeck. pp. 433–446. ISBN 978-3-16-157719-2.
- Harrak, Amir (1998). "Arabisms in Part IV of the Syriac Chronicle of Zuqnin". Symposium Syriacum VII. Roma: Pontificio Istituto Orientale. pp. 469–498. ISBN 978-88-7210-319-7.
- Harrak, Amir, ed. (1999). The Chronicle of Zuqnīn, Parts III and IV: A.D. 488-775. Toronto: Pontifical Institute of Mediaeval Studies. ISBN 978-0-88844-286-4.
- Heinrichs, Wolfhart (1993). "The Modern Assyrians - Name and Nation". Semitica: Serta philologica Constantino Tsereteli dicata. Torino: Zamorani. pp. 99–114. ISBN 978-88-7158-024-1.
- Joseph, John B. (1997). "Assyria and Syria: Synonyms?" (PDF). Journal of Assyrian Academic Studies. 11 (2): 37–43. Archived from the original (PDF) on 15 July 2020.
- Joseph, John B. (1998). "The Bible and the Assyrians: It Kept their Memory Alive" (PDF). Journal of Assyrian Academic Studies. 12 (1): 70–76. Archived from the original (PDF) on 15 July 2020.
- Joseph, John B. (2000). The Modern Assyrians of the Middle East: A History of Their Encounter with Western Christian Missions, Archaeologists, and Colonial Powers. Leiden: Brill. ISBN 90-04-11641-9.
- Kawerau, Peter (1958). Amerika und die Orientalischen Kirchen: Ursprung und Anfang der amerikanischen Mission unter den Nationalkirchen Westasiens. Berlin: Walter de Gruyter. ISBN 978-3-11-083395-9.
- Kiraz, George A. (2019). The Syriac Orthodox in North America (1895–1995): A Short History. Piscataway, NJ: Gorgias Press. ISBN 978-1-4632-4037-0.
- Kiraz, George A. (2020). "Negotiating Identity with the Homeland: The Syriac Orthodox of North America in the Early Twentieth Century". From Polarization to Cohabitation in the New Middle East. Wiesbaden: Harrassowitz Verlag. pp. 77–94. ISBN 978-3-447-11456-1.
- Layard, Austen H. (1849a). Nineveh and its Remains: With an Account of a Visit to the Chaldean Christians of Kurdistan. Vol. 1. London: John Murray.
- Layard, Austen H. (1849b). Nineveh and its Remains: With an Account of a Visit to the Chaldean Christians of Kurdistan. Vol. 2. London: John Murray.
- Lipiński, Edward (2000). The Aramaeans: Their Ancient History, Culture, Religion. Leuven: Peeters Publishers. ISBN 978-90-429-0859-8.
- Makko, Aryo (2010). "The Historical Roots of Contemporary Controversies: National Revival and the Assyrian Concept of Unity". Journal of Assyrian Academic Studies. 24 (1): 58–86.
- Makko, Aryo (2011). "Between Integration and Exclusion: Reflections on Contemporary Assyrian Historiography". Journal of the Assyrian Academic Society. 25 (1–2): 25–31.
- Makko, Aryo (2012). "Discourse, Identity and Politics: A Transnational Approach to Assyrian Identity in the Twentieth Century". The Assyrian Heritage: Threads of Continuity and Influence. Uppsala: Uppsala Universitet. pp. 297–317. ISBN 978-91-554-8303-6.
- Makko, Aryo (2017). "The Assyrian Concept of Unity after Seyfo". The Assyrian Genocide: Cultural and Political Legacies. Vol. 1. London: Routledge. pp. 239–253. ISBN 978-1-138-28405-0.
- Malech, George D.; Malech, Nestorius G. (1910). History of the Syrian nation and the Old Evangelical-Apostolic Church of the East: From Remote Antiquity to the Present Time. Minneapolis: Author's edition.
- McClure, Erica (2001). "Language and Identity in the Assyrian Diaspora". Studies in the Linguistic Sciences. 31 (1): 107–120.
- Messo, Johny (2011). "The Origin of the Terms Syria(n) and Suryoyo: Once Again". Parole de l'Orient. 36: 111–125. Archived from the original on 5 October 2021.
- Messo, Johny (2017). Arameans and the Making of Assyrians: The Last Aramaic-speaking Christians of the Middle East. Aramaic Press. Archived from the original on 17 March 2022.
- Michael, Sargon R. "Opinion & Reflections on Prof. John Joseph's Latest Book" Zinda magazine (2002)
- Meyendorff, John (1989). Imperial Unity and Christian Divisions: The Church 450–680 A.D. Crestwood, NY: St. Vladimir's Seminary Press. ISBN 9780881410563.
- Millar, Fergus (2006). A Greek Roman Empire: Power and Belief under Theodosius II (408–450). Berkeley: University of California Press. ISBN 978-0-520-25391-9.
- Millar, Fergus (2015). Empire, Church and Society in the Late Roman Near East: Greeks, Jews, Syrians and Saracens. Leuven: Peeters Publishers. ISBN 978-90-429-3291-3.
- Morony, Michael G. (2005). "History and Identity in the Syrian Churches". Redefining Christian Identity: Cultural Interaction in the Middle East Since the Rise of Islam. Leuven: Peeters Publishers. pp. 1–33. ISBN 978-90-429-1418-6.
- Murre van den Berg, Heleen (2005). "The Church of the East in the Sixteenth to the Eighteenth Century: World Church or Ethnic Community?". Redefining Christian Identity: Cultural Interaction in the Middle East since the Rise of Islam. Leuven: Peeters Publishers. pp. 301–320. ISBN 978-90-429-1418-6.
- Murre van den Berg, Heleen (2007). "Syriac Christianity". The Blackwell Companion to Eastern Christianity. Malden: Blackwell. pp. 249–268. ISBN 978-0-470-76639-2.
- Mutlu-Numansen, Sofia; Ossewaarde, Marinus (2019). "A Struggle for Genocide Recognition: How the Aramean, Assyrian, and Chaldean Diasporas Link Past and Present" (PDF). Holocaust and Genocide Studies. 33 (3): 412–428. doi:10.1093/hgs/dcz045.
- Naby, Eden (2004). "From Lingua Franca to Endangered Language: The Legal Aspects of the Preservation of Aramaic in Iraq". On the Margins of Nations: Endangered Languages and Linguistic Rights. Bath: Foundation for Endangered Languages. pp. 197–203. ISBN 978-0-9538248-6-1.
- Nisan, Mordechai (2002). Minorities in the Middle East: A History of Struggle and Self-Expression (2nd ed.). Jefferson, NC: McFarland. ISBN 978-0-7864-5133-3.
- Nöldeke, Theodor (1871). "Ασσύριος Σύριος Σύρος". Hermes. 5 (3): 443–468. JSTOR 4471183.
- Nordgren, Kenneth. Vems är historien? Historia som medvetande, kultur och handling i det mångkulturella Sverige (PDF) (Thesis) (in Swedish). Nationella Forskarskolan i Pedagogiskt Arbete nr 3. Archived from the original (PDF) on 6 November 2006.
- O'Mahony, Anthony (2006). "Syriac Christianity in the modern Middle East". The Cambridge History of Christianity: Eastern Christianity. Vol. 5. Cambridge: Cambridge University Press. pp. 511–536. ISBN 978-0-521-81113-2.
- O'Mahony, Anthony (2008). "Patriarchs and Politics: The Chaldean Catholic Church in Modern Iraq". Christianity in the Middle East: Studies in Modern History, Theology, and Politics. London: Melisende. pp. 105–142. ISBN 978-1-901764-49-9.
- Omtzigt, Pieter; Tamcke, Martin; Hurst, Alan; Teule, Herman; Nieper, Jens; Makko, Aryo; Pastoor, Dennis; Onder, Soner; Oberkampf, Horst (2012). The Slow Disappearance of the Syriacs from Turkey, and of the Grounds of the Mor Gabriel Monastery (PDF). LIT Verlag Münster. ISBN 978-3643902689.
- Özcoşar, Ibrahim (2014). "Separation and Conflict: Syriac Jacobites and Syriac Catholics in Mardin in the Eighteenth and Nineteenth Centuries". Byzantine and Modern Greek Studies. 38 (2): 201–217. doi:10.1179/0307013114Z.00000000045. S2CID 162368464.
- Özcoşar, Ibrahim (2017). "Community, Power, Identity: Identity Crisis of the Ottoman Süryanis". Syriac in its Multi-Cultural Context. Leuven: Peeters Publishers. pp. 327–335. ISBN 978-90-429-3164-0.
- Özdemir (2012). Assyrian Identity and the Great War: Nestorian, Chaldean and Syrian Christians in the 20th Century. Dunbeath: Whittles Publishing. ISBN 978-1-84995-060-2.
- Oussani, Gabriel (1901). "The Modern Chaldeans and Nestorians, and the Study of Syriac among Them". Journal of the American Oriental Society. 22: 79–96. doi:10.2307/592420. JSTOR 592420.
- Parpola, Simo (2000). "Assyrians after Assyria". Journal of the Assyrian Academic Society. 12 (2): 1–16. Archived from the original on 26 April 2008.
- Parpola, Simo (2004). "National and Ethnic Identity in the Neo-Assyrian Empire and Assyrian Identity in Post-Empire Times" (PDF). Journal of Assyrian Academic Studies. 18 (2): 5–22. Archived from the original (PDF) on 28 November 2007.
- Perczel, István (2019). "Syriac Christianity in India". The Syriac World. London: Routledge. pp. 653–697. ISBN 978-1-138-89901-8.
- Power, Edmond (1919). "The National Problem in Syria and Mesopotamia". Studies: An Irish Quarterly Review. 8 (29): 77–94. JSTOR 30092955.
- Rassam, Hormuzd (1885). "Biblical Nationalities Past and Present". Transactions of the Society of Biblical Archaeology. 8: 358–385.
- Río Sánchez, Francisco del (2007). "The Aramaean Speakers of Iraq in the Arabic Sources". Eastern Crossroads: Essays on Medieval Christian Legacy. Piscataway, NJ: Gorgias Press. pp. 359–368. doi:10.31826/9781463212827-022. ISBN 978-1-4632-1282-7.
- Río Sánchez, Francisco del (2013). "Arabic-Karshuni: An Attempt to Preserve the Maronite Identity: The Case of Aleppo". The Levantine Review. 2 (1): 3–11. doi:10.6017/lev.v2i1.5079.
- Roller, Duane W., ed. (2014). The Geography of Strabo: An English Translation, with Introduction and Notes. Cambridge: Cambridge University Press. ISBN 978-1-139-95249-1.
- Rollinger, Robert (2006a). "Assyrios, Syrios, Syros und Leukosyros". Die Welt des Orients. 36: 72–82. JSTOR 25684050.
- Rollinger, Robert (2006b). "The Terms Assyria and Syria Again" (PDF). Journal of Near Eastern Studies. 65 (4): 283–287. doi:10.1086/511103. S2CID 162760021.
- Rompay, Lucas van (1999). "Jacob of Edessa and the Early History of Edessa". After Bardaisan: Studies on Continuity and Change in Syriac Christianity. Louvain: Peeters Publishers. pp. 269–285. ISBN 978-90-429-0735-5.
- Saggs, Henry W. F. (1984). The Might That Was Assyria. London: Sidgwick & Jackson. ISBN 978-0-312-03511-2.
- Salameh, Franck (2020). "Young Phoenicians and the Quest for a Lebanese Language: Between Lebanonism, Phoenicianism, and Arabism". Arabic and its Alternatives: Religious Minorities and their Languages in the Emerging Nation States of the Middle East (1920–1950). Leiden-Boston: Brill. pp. 111–129. doi:10.1163/9789004423220_005. ISBN 978-90-04-38269-5. S2CID 216165898.
- Salibi, Kamal S. (1971). "The Lebanese Identity". Journal of Contemporary History. 6 (1): 76–86. doi:10.1177/002200947100600104. JSTOR 259624. S2CID 155006124.
- Salibi, Kamal S. (1988). A House of Many Mansions: The History of Lebanon Reconsidered. Berkeley: University of California Press. ISBN 978-0-520-07196-4.
- Sato, Noriko (2018). "The Memory of Sayfo and its Relation to the Identity of Contemporary Assyrian/Aramean Christians in Syria". Sayfo 1915: An Anthology of Essays on the Genocide of Assyrians/Arameans during the First World War. Piscataway, NJ: Gorgias Press. pp. 305–326. ISBN 978-1-4632-0730-4.
- Schwartz, Eduard (1931). "Einiges über Assyrien, Syrien und Koilesyrien". Philologus. 86 (1–4): 373–399. doi:10.1524/phil.1931.86.14.380. S2CID 163792609.
- Schwartz, Eduard (1932). "Noch einiges über Assyrien und Syrien". Philologus. 87: 261–263. doi:10.1515/phil-1932-0208. S2CID 164348684.
- Seleznyov, Nikolai N. (2013). "Jacobs and Jacobites: The Syrian Origins of the Name and its Egyptian Arabic Interpretations". Scrinium: Journal of Patrology, Critical Hagiographyand Ecclesiastical History. 9: 382–398.
- Southgate, Horatio (1840). Narrative of a Tour Through Armenia, Kurdistan, Persia and Mesopotamia. Vol. 2. London: Tilt and Bogue.
- Southgate, Horatio (1842). "Report of a Visit of the Rev. H. Southgate to the Syrian Church of Mesopotamia, 1841". The Spirit of Missions. 7: 163–174, 246–251, 276–280.
- Southgate, Horatio (1844). Narrative of a Visit to the Syrian (Jacobite) Church of Mesopotamia. New York: Appleton.
- Spinks, Bryan D. (2007). "Eastern Christian Liturgical Traditions: Oriental Orthodox". The Blackwell Companion to Eastern Christianity. Malden: Blackwell. pp. 339–367. ISBN 978-0-470-76639-2.
- Taylor, William (2013). Narratives of Identity: The Syrian Orthodox Church and the Church of England 1895-1914. Newcastle upon Tyne: Cambridge Scholars Publishing. ISBN 978-1-4438-6946-1.
- Tekoğlu, Recai; Lemaire, André; İpek, İsmet; Tosun, Kazım (2000). "La bilingue royale louvito-phénicienne de Çineköy" (PDF). Comptes rendus des séances de l'Académie des Inscriptions et Belles-Lettres. 144 (3): 961–1007.
- Thackeray, Henry St. John, ed. (1961) [1930]. Josephus: Jewish Antiquities, Books I-IV. Vol. 4. London: William Heinemann. ISBN 978-0-674-99267-2.
- Travis, Hannibal (2010). Genocide in the Middle East: The Ottoman Empire, Iraq, and Sudan. Durham, NC: Carolina Academic Press. ISBN 978-1-59460-436-2.
- Trigona-Harany, Benjamin (2013). The Ottoman Süryânî from 1908 to 1914. Piscataway, NJ: Gorgias Press. ISBN 978-1-60724-069-3.
- Tvedtnes, John A. (1981). "The Origin of the Name Syria". Journal of Near Eastern Studies. 40 (2): 139–140. doi:10.1086/372868. S2CID 161771865.
- Van-Lennep, Henry J. (1875). Bible Lands: Their Modern Customs and Manners Illustrative of Scripture. New York: Harper & Brothers.
- Walker, Joel T. (2012). "From Nisibis to Xi'an: The Church of the East in Late Antique Eurasia". The Oxford Handbook of Late Antiquity. Oxford: Oxford University Press. pp. 994–1052. ISBN 978-0-19-027753-6.
- Wells, Herbert G. (1920). The New and Revised Outline of History. Vol. 1. New York: Macmillan.
- Wickeri, Philip L. (2007). "The Mar Thoma Christians of Kerala: A Study of the Relationship between Liturgy and Mission in the Indian Context". Christian Worship Worldwide: Expanding Horizons, Deepening Practices. Grand Rapids: Eerdmans. pp. 71–95. ISBN 978-0-8028-2853-8.
- Williams, Daniel H. (2013). "The Evolution of Pro-Nicene Theology in the Church of the East". From the Oxus River to the Chinese Shores: Studies on East Syriac Christianity in China and Central Asia. Münster: LIT Verlag. pp. 387–395. ISBN 978-3-643-90329-7.
- Wilmshurst, David (2000). The Ecclesiastical Organisation of the Church of the East, 1318–1913. Louvain: Peeters Publishers. ISBN 978-90-429-0876-5.
- Wilmshurst, David (2011). The martyred Church: A History of the Church of the East. London: East & West Publishing Limited. ISBN 978-1-907318-04-7.
- Winkler, Dietmar W. (2013). "Christianity in the Middle East: Some historical remarks and preliminary demographic figures". Syriac Christianity in the Middle East and India: Contributions and Challenges. Piscataway, NJ: Gorgias Press. pp. 107–125. doi:10.31826/9781463235864-011. ISBN 978-1-4632-3586-4.
- Winkler, Dietmar W. (2019). "The Syriac Church Denominations: An Overview". The Syriac World. London: Routledge. pp. 119–133. ISBN 978-1-138-89901-8.
- Woźniak, Marta (2011). "National and Social Identity Construction among the Modern Assyrians/Syrians". Parole de l'Orient. 36: 569–583.
- Woźniak, Marta (2012). "Far from Aram-Nahrin: The Suryoye Diaspora Experience". Border Terrains: World Diasporas in the 21st Century. Oxford: United Kingdom Inter-Disciplinary Press. pp. 73–83. ISBN 978-1-84888-117-4.
- Woźniak, Marta (2015a). "From religious to ethno-religious: Identity change among Assyrians/Syriacs in Sweden" (PDF). European Consortium for Political Research (ECPR).
- Woźniak, Marta (2015b). "The Modem Arameans: In Search for National Identity". Parole de l'Orient. 40: 483–496.
- Wood, Philip (2012). "Syriac and the Syrians". The Oxford Handbook of Late Antiquity. Oxford: Oxford University Press. pp. 170–194. ISBN 978-0-19-027753-6.
- Yana, George V. (2000). "Myth vs Reality". Journal of Assyrian Academic Studies. 14 (1): 78–82. Archived from the original on 3 May 2004.
- Yana, George V. (2008). Ancient and Modern Assyrians: A Scientific Analysis. Philadelphia: Exlibris Corporation. ISBN 978-1-4653-1629-5.
- Yildiz, Efrem (1999). "The Assyrians: A Historical and Current Reality". Journal of Assyrian Academic Studies. 13 (1): 15–30.
- Yildiz, Efrem (2000). "Los Asirio-Caldeos, Cristianos orientales arameoparlantes" (PDF). Dialogo Ecumenico. 35 (112): 263–282.
