= Çineköy inscription =

Bilingual inscription from Anatolia in 8th century BC

Coordinates: 36°47′54″N 35°15′37″E

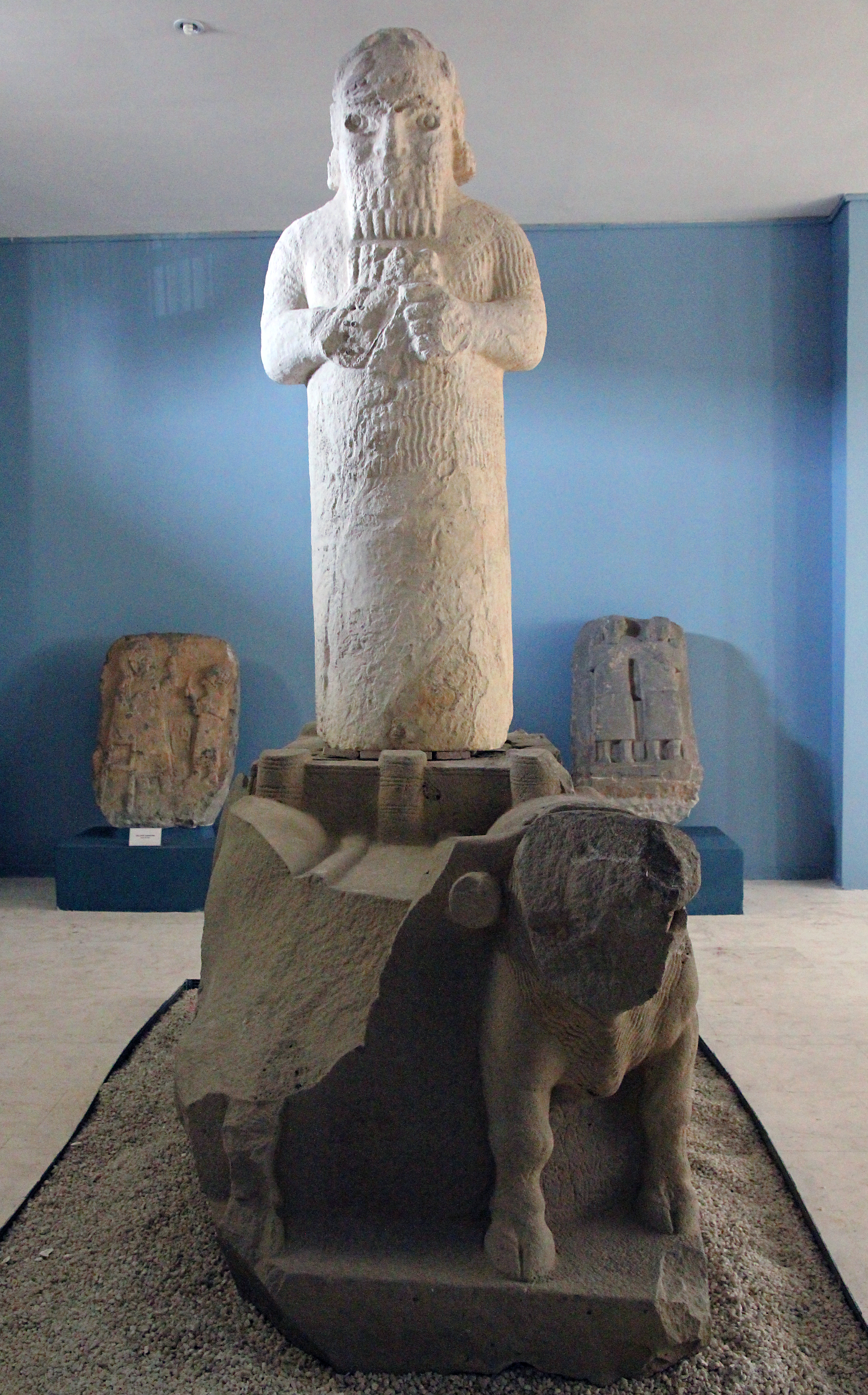
- The statue, currently in the Adana Archaeology Museum
- Created: c. 800 BC
- Discovered: 1997; Adana, Turkey
- Present location: Adana, Adana Province, Turkey
- Language: Hieroglyphic Luwian and Phoenician

Distribution of the Luwian language, shown in purple.

The Çineköy inscription is an ancient bilingual inscription, written in Hieroglyphic Luwian and Phoenician languages. The inscription is dated to the second half of the 8th century BC. It was uncovered in 1997 near the village of Çine, that is located some 30 km south of Adana, capital city of the Adana Province (ancient Cilicia) in southern Turkey.

The find was first reported and described in 1999, and the first edition of the inscription was published in 2000. Important additions to interpretation of the inscription were made in 2007, 2012, 2015, and 2017.

Another important inscription of the same type is known as the Karatepe inscription, which was known earlier. Both of these inscriptions trace the kings of ancient Adana from the "house of Mopsos" (given in Hieroglyphic Luwian as Muksa and in Phoenician as Mopsos in the form mps). He was a legendary king of antiquity.

== Background ==
The object on which the inscription is found is a monument to the Storm God Tarhunza. The inscription was authored by the ruler known as Urikki in Assyrian texts, which is equivalent to War(a)ika in Luwian. The question whether it is the same person as Awar(i)ku of the Karatepe inscription or a different one remains debatable. He was the vassal king of Quwê (Assyrian name), the modern Cilicia. In Luwian this region was known as 'Hiyawa'.

In this monumental inscription, Urikki made reference to the relationship between his kingdom and his Assyrian overlords. Also, in the Phoenician version of the inscription, Awariku claims to have built 15 fortresses in his kingdom. In the Luwian version of the same inscription, the same sentence is misinterpreted as a reference to destroying fortresses.

== Syria as Luwian designation for Assyria ==
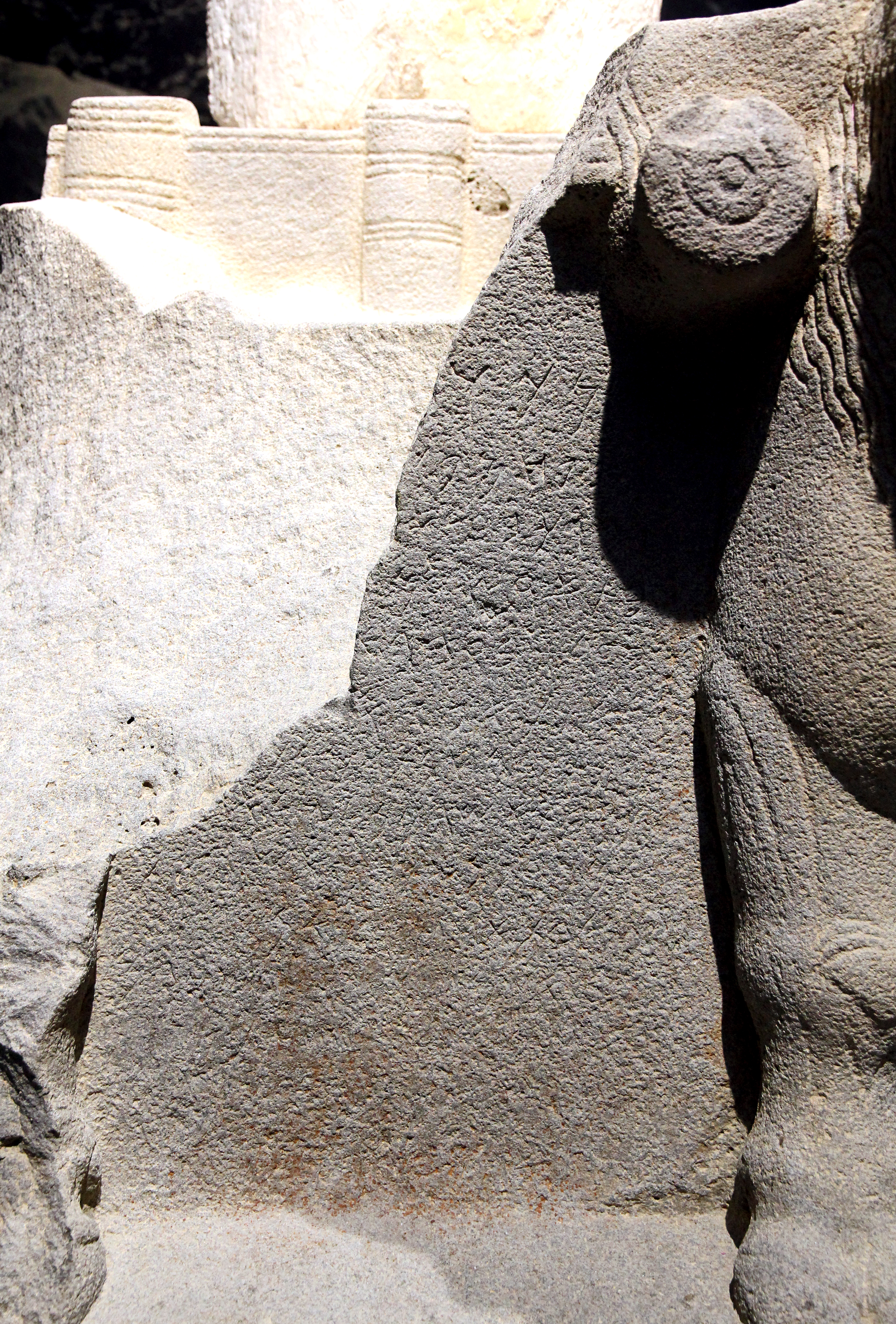
The Phoenician inscription

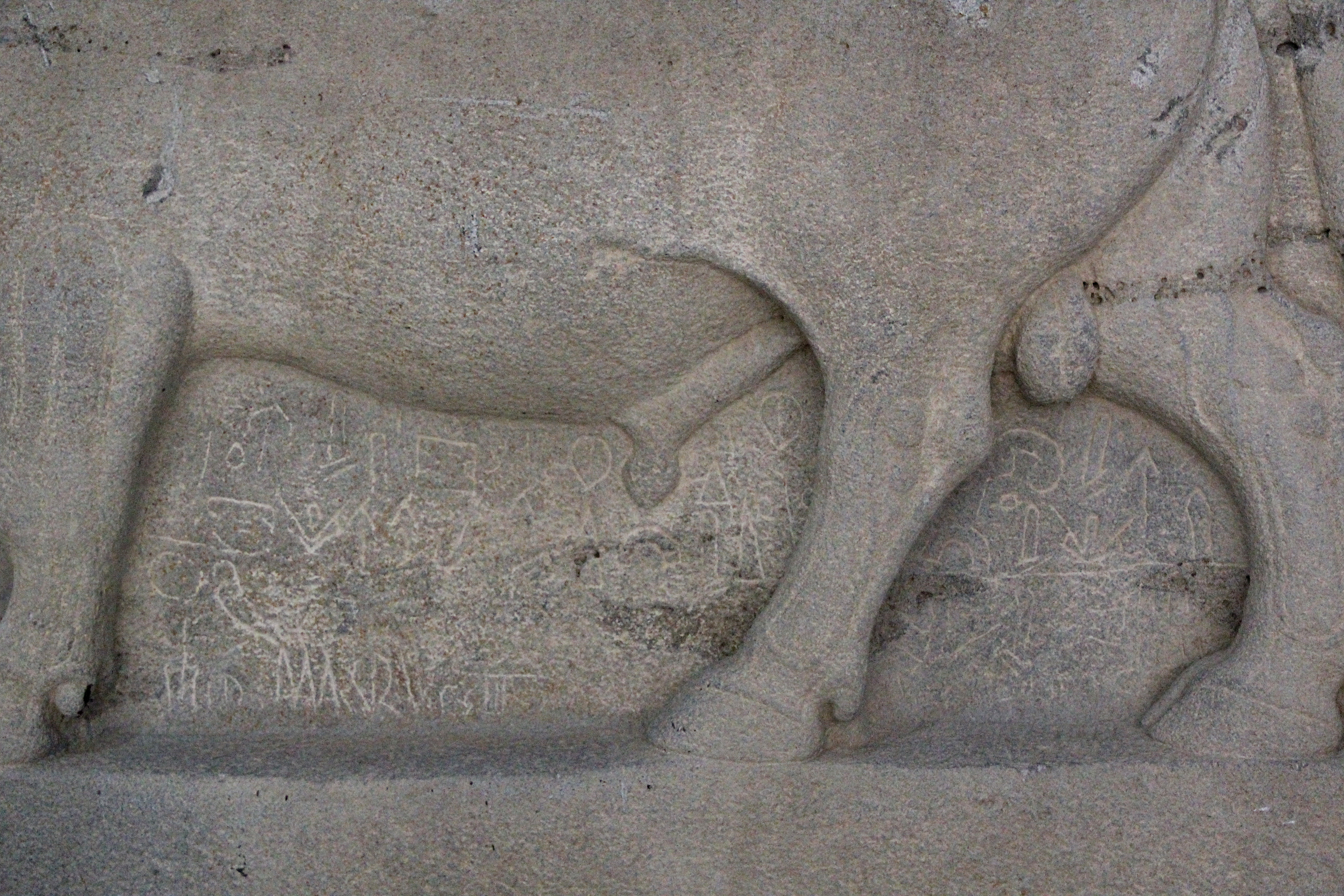
Part of Çineköy inscription in Adana Archaeology Museum

The Çineköy inscription has a special significance for determining the origin (etymology) of the term Syria, a question that was debated among scholars since 1871, when Theodor Nöldeke proposed a linguistic explanation based on derivation of Syria from Assyria. That explanation received majority support among scholars. Discovery of the Çineköy inscription provided additional evidence for a direct connection between terms Syria and Assyria. The Phoenician section of the inscription mentions ʾŠR (Ashur), and also ʾŠRYM (Assyrians), while the Luwian section narrates the same content by using su+ra/i- (Syria). Analyzing the inscription, historian Robert Rollinger pointed out in 2006 that the Luwian section provides conclusive evidence for the original use of the term Syria as synonym for Assyria, thus settling the question.

The examined section of the Phoenician inscription reads:

And the king [of Aššur and (?)]
the whole "House" of Aššur (’ŠR) were for me a father [and a]
mother, and the DNNYM and the Assyrians (’ŠRYM)
were a single "House".

The corresponding section of the Luwian inscription reads:

§VI And then, the/an Assyrian king (su+ra/i-wa/i-ni-sa(URBS)) and the whole Assyrian "House" (su+ra/i-wa/i-za-ha(URBS)) were made a fa[ther and a mo]ther for me,
§VII and Hiyawa and Assyria (su+ra/i-wa/i-ia-sa-ha(URBS)) were made a single "House".

Noting the scholarly consensus on the interpretation of terms Syria/Assyria in the Çineköy inscription, some researchers have also analyzed similar terms that appear in other contemporary inscriptions, suggesting some additional interpretations.

== See also ==
- Name of Syria
- Terms for Syriac Christians
- Luwian-Aramean states
- Karatepe bilingual

== Sources ==
- Bryce, Trevor R. (2012). The World of The Neo-Hittite Kingdoms: A Political and Military History. New York: Oxford University Press. ISBN 978-0-19-150502-7.
- Bryce, Trevor R. (2016). "The Land of Hiyawa (Que) Revisited". Anatolian Studies. 66: 67–79. doi:10.1017/S0066154616000053. JSTOR 24878364. S2CID 163486778.
- Dinçol, Ali; Dinçol, Belkis; Hawkins, John David; Marchetti, Nicolò; Peker, Hasan (2014). "A Stele by Suhi I from Karkemish". Orientalia. 83 (2): 143–153.
- Hawkins, John David; Weeden, Mark (2016). "Sketch history of Karkamish in the earlier Iron Age (Iron I–IIB)" (PDF). Carchemish in Context. Oxford-Philadelphia: Oxbow Books. pp. 9–21.
- Hawkins, John David (2017). "The Ending of the Çineköy Inscription". At the Dawn of History: Ancient Near Eastern Studies in Honour of J. N. Postgate. Eisenbrauns: Penn State University Press. pp. 211–216. ISBN 9781575064710.
- İpek, İsmet; Tosun, Kazım; Tekoğlu, Recai (1999). "Adana Geç Hitit Kurtarma Kazısı 1997 Yılı Çalışma Sonuçları" (PDF). IX. Müze Kurtarma Kazıları Semineri. Ankara: Kültür Bakanlığı Milli Kütüphane Basımevi. pp. 173–188.
- Lanfranchi, Giovanni B. (2005). "The Luwian-Phoenician Bilingual of Çineköy and the Annexation of Cilicia to the Assyrian Empire". Von Sumer bis Homer. Münster: Ugarit Verlag. pp. 481–496. ISBN 9783934628663.
- Lanfranchi, Giovanni B. (2007). "The Luwian-Phoenician Bilinguals of Çineköy and Karatepe: An Ideological Dialogue" (PDF). Getrennte Wege?: Kommunikation, Raum und Wahrnehmung in der Alten Welt. Frankfurt am Main: Verlag Antike. pp. 179–217.
- Lanfranchi, Giovanni B. (2009). "A Happy Son of the King of Assyria: Warikas and the Çineköy Bilingual (Cilicia)". Of God(s), Trees, Kings, and Scholars. Helsinki: Finnish Oriental Society. pp. 127–150.
- Lanfranchi, Giovanni B. (2011). "The Expansion of the Neo-Assyrian Empire and Its Peripheries: Military, Political and Ideological Resistance". Lag Troia in Kilikien? Der aktuelle Streit um Homers Ilias. Darmstadt: Wissenschaftliche Buchgesellschaft. pp. 225–239.
- Nöldeke, Theodor (1871). "Ασσύριος Σύριος Σύρος". Hermes. 5 (3): 443–468. JSTOR 4471183.
- Payne, Annick (2012). Iron Age Hieroglyphic Luwian Inscriptions. Atlanta: Society of Biblical Literature. ISBN 9781589836587.
- Rollinger, Robert (2006a). "Assyrios, Syrios, Syros und Leukosyros". Die Welt des Orients. 36: 72–82. JSTOR 25684050.
- Rollinger, Robert (2006b). "The Terms Assyria and Syria Again" (PDF). Journal of Near Eastern Studies. 65 (4): 283–287. doi:10.1086/511103. S2CID 162760021.
- Simon, Zsolt (2012). "Where is the Land of Sura of the Hieroglyphic Luwian inscription KARKAMIŠ A4b and Why Were Cappadocians Called Syrians by Greeks?". Altorientalische Forschungen. 39 (1): 167–180. doi:10.1524/aofo.2012.0011. S2CID 163257058.
- Simon, Zsolt (2014). "Awarikus und Warikas: Zwei Könige von Hiyawa". Zeitschrift für Assyriologie. 104 (1): 91–103. doi:10.1515/za-2014-0005. S2CID 163412988.
- Tekoğlu, Recai; Lemaire, André; İpek, İsmet; Tosun, Kazım (2000). "La bilingue royale louvito-phénicienne de Çineköy" (PDF). Comptes rendus des séances de l'Académie des Inscriptions et Belles-Lettres. 144 (3): 961–1007.
- Weeden, Mark (2013). "After the Hittites: The Kingdoms of Karkamish and Palistin in Northern Syria" (PDF). Bulletin of the Institute of Classical Studies. 56 (2): 1–20. doi:10.1111/j.2041-5370.2013.00055.x.
- Yakubovich, Ilya (2015a). "Phoenician and Luwian in Early Iron Age Cilicia". Anatolian Studies. 65: 35–55. doi:10.1017/S0066154615000010. S2CID 162771440.
- Yakubovich, Ilya (2015b). "Adanawa or Ahhiyawa? Reply to the Addendum by J. D. Hawkins". Anatolian Studies. 65: 56–58. doi:10.1017/S0066154615000034. S2CID 162544286.
