= World Council of Arameans =

- World Council of Arameans (Syriacs)
- ܚܘܝܕܐ ܣܘܪܝܝܐ ܬܒܝܠܝܐ
- Logo of the WCA, enacted in 2019
- Abbreviation: WCA
- Predecessor: Syriac Universal Alliance
- Formation: 1983
- Founded at: New Jersey
- Type: Non-governmental organization
- Legal status: Special Consultative Status within the United Nations Economic and Social Council
- Official language: Neo-Aramaic languages
- President: Johny Messo
- Website: wca-ngo.org

World Council of Arameans (Syriacs) (Syriac: ܚܘܝܕܐ ܣܘܪܝܝܐ ܬܒܝܠܝܐ, romanized: Ḥuyōdō Suryōyō Tbelōyō), previously known as the Syriac Universal Alliance, is an international non-government umbrella organization. It aims to "protect and secure the rights, liberty and equality of the Aramean people, safeguard and promote the cultural heritage of its ancestors, ensuring justice, and uniting all its people as a self-determined and internationally recognized Aramean nation." Its membership consists of several national associations, representing Arameans from various countries around the world. The position of the SUA/WCA president is regarded as representative within Aramean/Syriac community. Since 2009, the organization is presided by Johny Messo.

== Activities ==
The organization was founded in on 16 July 1983, in New Jersey, as the Syriac Universal Alliance (SUA), on the initiative of the American Aramaic Association and the Swedish Syriac Federation. It was later joined by several other Aramean organizations from various countries. In 1999, SUA was given a Special Consultative Status by the United Nations Economic and Social Council.

From 1999 to 2002, the organization was presided by Habib Afram (b. 1954), an Aramean/Syriac politician from Lebanon. He was succeeded by Gabriel Marawgeh, an Aramean/Syriac politician from Sweden, who represented SUA at the conference on genocide against Aramean people, held on 6 November 2007 in Brussels, under auspices of the European Parliament.

Under the presidency of Johny Messo, the organization intensified its support for the notion of Aramean continuity, and also for the promotion of Arameandom (Oromoyutho), primarily among those who self-identify as Arameans, but some wider concepts are also advocated. On several occasions, representatives of SUA/WCA stated that some other Aramaic-speaking communities of the Near East, such as modern Assyrians and modern Chaldeans, should also be viewed as Arameans, thus advancing a pan-Aramean narrative, that provoked reactions from other communities.

Representatives of SUA/WCA have criticized the policy of Arabization that was affecting both linguistic and ethnic identity of Arameans and other non-Arab communities in some Arab countries, particularly in Syria.

In 2011, as a result of cooperation between SUA and the Council of Europe, an educational program was initiated under the name "1st Aramean Young Leadership Programme: The Road to the Future".

In 2012, the official name of the organization was changed to World Council of Arameans (Syriacs). The new name was adopted in order to emphasize and promote Aramean identity, but the traditional Syriac designation was also kept as a symbol of continuity.

In 2015, WCA had an active role in manifestations commemorating centenary (1915-2015) of genocides committed by the Ottoman Empire against various Christian communities in the Near East.

In 2016, representatives of WCA participated in the conference "The Alarming Situation and Persecution of Aramean Christians" that was held on 25 May in Brussels, organized by the European People's Party group of the European Parliament.

The WCA delegation participated at the "Third International Conference on the victims of ethnic and religious violence in the Middle East" that was held in Brussels on 14 May 2018, under auspices of Belgian Ministry of Foreign Affairs.

In 2019, WCA representative Hala Naoum Néhmé, an Aramean politician from the Netherlands, was selected by the UN and appointed by Geir Otto Pedersen (UN Special Envoy for Syria) as one of 50 selected members of the Syrian Constitutional Committee.

== Members of the WCA ==
The current member-organizations of WCA are:

- Australia: World Council of Arameans - Australia
- Austria: Syriac Association of Vienna, in Austria
- Belgium: Federation of Arameans in Belgium (Fédération des Araméens de Belgique)
- Germany: Federation of Arameans in Germany (Bundesverband der Aramäer in Deutschland)
- Netherlands: Federation of Arameans (Suryoye) in the Netherlands (Suryoye Aramese Federatie Nederland)
- Sweden: Syriac Federation of Sweden (Syrianska riksförbundet i Sverige)
- Switzerland: Federation of Arameans (Syriacs) in Switzerland (Föderation der Aramäer in der Schweiz)
- United Kingdom: Aramean Association of the United Kingdom
- United States: Aramaic American Association

== See also ==
- Aramean diaspora

== Sources ==
- Atto, Naures (2011a). Hostages in the Homeland, Orphans in the Diaspora: Identity Discourses Among the Assyrian/Syriac Elites in the European Diaspora. Leiden: Leiden University Press. ISBN 978-90-8728-148-9.
- Atto, Naures (2011b). "A Flock without a Shepherd". Parole de l'Orient. 36: 191–200.
- Bakker-Kellogg, Sarah (2015). "Ritual sounds, political echoes: Vocal agency and the sensory cultures of secularism in the Dutch Syriac diaspora". American Ethnologist. 42 (3): 431–445. doi:10.1111/amet.12139.
- Bakker-Kellogg, Sarah (2019). "Perforating Kinship: Syriac Christianity, Ethnicity, and Secular Legibility". Current Anthropology. 60 (4): 475–498. doi:10.1086/705233. hdl:1874/386369. S2CID 224800760.
- Brock, Sebastian P.; Witakowski, Witold, eds. (2001). The Hidden Pearl: The Syrian Orthodox Church and its Ancient Aramaic Heritage. Vol. 3. Rome: Trans World Film Italia.
- Dos Santos, Vanessa V. (2017). The effect of frame and format on online engagement: Shares, followers & donations for an NGO by social media. Master's thesis. Twente: Faculty of Behavioural, Management & Social Sciences.
- Gedeon, Charles, ed. (2005). Who's who in Lebanon (18th ed.). Beirut: Publitec Publications.
- Mutlu-Numansen, Sofia; Ossewaarde, Marinus (2019). "A Struggle for Genocide Recognition: How the Aramean, Assyrian, and Chaldean Diasporas Link Past and Present" (PDF). Holocaust and Genocide Studies. 33 (3): 412–428. doi:10.1093/hgs/dcz045.
- Sengo, Gabriel (2002). "Prevention of discrimination" (PDF). United Nations Economic and Social Council.
- Smyth, Phillip (2012). "Syria's 31 Percenters: How Bashar Al-Asad Built Minority Alliances and Countered Minority Foes". Middle East Review of International Affairs. 16 (1): 25–42. ProQuest 1189391617.
- SUA Youth Academy (2011). "1st Aramean Young Leadership Programme: The Road to the Future". Council of Europe.
- Weaver, Christina Michelle; Kiraz, George A. (2016). "Turoyo Neo-Aramaic in Northern New Jersey" (PDF). International Journal of the Sociology of Language. 237: 19–36.
- Woźniak, Marta (2015). "From religious to ethno-religious: Identity change among Assyrians/Syriacs in Sweden" (PDF). European Consortium for Political Research.
