= Robert D. Biggs =

American Assyriologist

Robert D. Biggs was Professor of Assyriology in the Department of Near Eastern Languages and Civilizations at the University of Chicago. He received his PhD at Johns Hopkins University in 1962. He was an editor of the Journal of Near Eastern Studies. He retired from the University of Chicago in June 2004.

== See also ==
- Simo Parpola
- H. W. F. Saggs
