= John Joseph (historian) =

American historian (1923–2020)

- Born: John B. Joseph; September 1, 1923; Iraq
- Died: September 1, 2020 (aged 97); Lancaster, Pennsylvania, U.S.
- Education: Franklin & Marshall College; Princeton University (PhD)
- Occupations: Historian; educator

John B. Joseph (September 1, 1923 – September 1, 2020) was an Assyrian-American educator and historian of Middle Eastern studies. He taught courses on the history of the Middle East and its relationship with the West at Franklin & Marshall College (F&M) in Lancaster, Pennsylvania, from 1961 to 1988.

== Biography ==
Joseph was born in Iraq in September 1923. He was the son of refugees from the Sayfo in pre-Iran Persia, John B. (Benjamin) Joseph attended the American School for Boys in Baghdad. Pennsylvania missionary Calvin Staudt founded the school with his wife Ida. He occasionally sent students to his alma mater, F&M. Joseph arrived in 1946, received his degree from F&M in 1950, and subsequently earned a Ph.D. from Princeton University. In his long teaching career at F&M, he inspired many students, including business executive Andrew Schindler, class of 1972, who contributed the leading sum for the construction of the "John Joseph International Center" at F&M, dedicated to the study of the world's languages, culture, history and politics. Following his retirement from full-time teaching, Joseph has held the title of Lewis Audenreid Professor Emeritus of History.

He died in Lancaster, Pennsylvania, on his 97th birthday in September 2020.

== Bibliography ==
- Joseph, John B. (1959). "The Turko-Iraqi Frontier and the Assyrians". The World of Islam: Studies in Honour of Philip K. Hitti. London: Macmillan. pp. 255–270.
- Joseph, John B. (1961). The Nestorians and Their Muslim Neighbors: A Study of Western Influence on Their Relations. Princeton: Princeton University Press.
- Joseph, John B. (1975). "The Assyrian Affair: A Historical Perspective". International Journal of Middle East Studies. 6 (1): 115–117. doi:10.1017/S0020743800024351. JSTOR 162737.
- Joseph, John B. (1983). Muslim-Christian Relations and Inter-Christian Rivalries in the Middle East: The Case of the Jacobites in an Age of Transition. Albany: State University of New York Press. ISBN 9780873956000.
- Joseph, John B. (1997). "Assyria and Syria: Synonyms?" (PDF). Journal of Assyrian Academic Studies. 11 (2): 37–43. Archived from the original (PDF) on July 15, 2020.
- Joseph, John B. (1998). "The Bible and the Assyrians: It Kept their Memory Alive" (PDF). Journal of Assyrian Academic Studies. 12 (1): 70–76. Archived from the original (PDF) on July 15, 2020.
- Joseph, John B. (1999). "We seem to have an identity crisis and for no reason". Zinda Magazine. 5 (17).
- Joseph, John B. (2000). The Modern Assyrians of the Middle East: A History of Their Encounter with Western Christian Missions, Archaeologists, and Colonial Powers. Leiden: Brill. ISBN 9004116419.
- Joseph, John B. (2002). "Exploiting the Assyrian Presence in Iraq". Zinda Magazine. 7 (43).
- Joseph, John B. (2002). "Response to J. F. Coakley's Review" (PDF). Hugoye: Journal of Syriac Studies. 5 (2): 272–276.
- Joseph, John B. (2004). "Selective reading deceives readers". Zinda Magazine. 10 (35).
