= Peyton R. Helm =

American academic and college president

Peyton Randolph "Randy" Helm was the eleventh president of Muhlenberg College, located in Allentown, Pennsylvania. Helm took office on July 1, 2003, and departed on June 30, 2015.

== Biography ==
=== Education ===
Helm earned a B.A. in archaeology from Yale University. He holds a doctorate in ancient history, specializing in ancient Greek and Near Eastern history and literature, from the University of Pennsylvania.

=== Career ===
==== University of Pennsylvania ====
From 1979 – 1988, Helm worked at the University of Pennsylvania in various capacities. He served as senior administrative fellow and assistant dean of the college, Hill College House, at the University of Pennsylvania and functioned as chief operating officer and as assistant dean for academic advising in the College of Arts and Sciences from 1979 – 1981. Between 1981 and 1984, he worked as coordinator of college house programs and as chief operating officer for the university's six college houses. From 1984 – 1986, he served as associate director of development for the School of Arts and Sciences. He served as director of development, School of Arts & Sciences, from 1986 – 1988 and was responsible for laying groundwork for the school's component of the university's $1 billion campaign.

==== Colby College ====
From 1988 to 2003, Helm worked at Colby College in Waterville, Maine. He served as vice president for development and alumni relations and as campaign director from 1988 – 2001 through the completion of the college's $100 million campaign, with comprehensive totals equaling $150 million. From 2001 – 2003, he worked as vice president for development and alumni relations. He continues to do contract work at Colby as an instructor in the Classics Department. He runs an annual January Program course about the Bronze Age Collapse where students travel to Greece (in 2023 the course went to Egypt and Turkey, but this was a one-time affair.)

==== Muhlenberg College ====
Helm served as the president of Muhlenberg College in Allentown, Pennsylvania from July 1, 2003 to June 30 2015. Helm led the college's $105 million capital campaign, with totals exceeding $110 million.

During Helm's tenure, Muhlenberg completed construction of a life sports center, a science building, two major residential facilities, conversion of a former fraternity house into rehearsal space and an addition in classroom, office and dining space to the student union. Muhlenberg also added a film studies major along with minors in African-American studies and public health.

On July 1, 2010, Helm received a new five-year contract from Muhlenberg College. He retired from Muhlenberg effective June 30, 2015.

==== University of Massachusetts-Dartmouth ====
Helm served as the interim Chancellor at University of Massachusetts Dartmouth between January 2016 and June 2017.

He currently serves as a trustee of the American Society of Overseas Research (ASOR) and as a member of the Yale Alumni Association board of governors.
