= Robert Rollinger =

Austrian historian (born 1964)

Robert Rollinger (born 17 September 1964 in Bludenz, Austria) is an ancient historian and Assyriologist, known for his works on Herodotus, the Persian-Achaemenid Empire, ancient empires and cross-cultural encountering in the ancient world. He is a full professor at the University of Innsbruck and a full member of the Austrian Academy of Sciences (ÖAW).

== Academic career ==
He studied Ancient History, History, and Ancient Near East studies at the University of Innsbruck from 1984 to 1989, where he earned his MA in 1989 with an interdisciplinary thesis on Herodotus’ Babylonian Logos. 1993, he earned his Ph.D with. a dissertation focused on early forms of historical thinking in the Ur III-period. In. In 1999, he finished his habilitation on cultural connections between Greece and the Ancient Near East during the 8th and 5th century BCE. He was a lecturer, senior lecturer and reader in the department of Ancient History and Ancient Near Eastern Studies at Innsbruck from 1990 until 2005. Since 2005, he has been holding the chair for “cultural interactions between the ancient Near East and the Mediterranean” in the department of Ancient History and Ancient Near Eastern Studies at the University of Innsbruck. His academic teachers were Reinhold Bichler and Karl Oberhuber.

In 2007, he was a visiting professor at the University of Hildesheim. From 2010-2015, he was the Finland Distinguished Professor at the University of Helsinki in the Department of World Cultures where he headed the research project “Intellectual Heritage of the Ancient Near East.” From 2006-2008 and 2010-2011, he was a visiting professor at the Institute for the Study of Muslim Civilisations at the Aga Khan University in London. From 2013-2017, he was chair of the “Melammu” project (an endeavor dedicated to studies on the “intellectual Heritage of Assyria and Babylonia on East and West”), which gathers together scholars with international renown. In 2019, the Getty Research Center in Los Angeles invited him to become a Getty Scholar. Since 2020, he holds the NAWA-chair at the University of Wrocław where he is the head of the international project “From the Achaemenid to the Roman Rule: Empires in Contexts – the Processes of Long Lasting.”

Rollinger is editor and co-editor of numerous journals and series, among which are Oriens et Occidens (Franz Steiner Verlag), Classica et Orientalia (Harrassowitz), Studies in Universal and Cultural History (Springer), Philippika (Harrassowitz), Melammu Symposia (Austrian Academy of Science), Empires Through the Ages in Global Perspective (de Gruyter), and the Ancient History Bulletin, Ancient West & East.

He is a member of international research groups hosted at the Collège de France and the Durham University, as well as a member of the core group of the European Network for the History of Ancient Greece. He is a full member of the Austrian Academy of Sciences (ÖAW), a corresponding member ot the Archaeological Institute of America (AIA) and of the German Archaeological Institute (DAI), and a member of the European Academy of Sciences and Arts.

In recent years, his research has focused on the history of empires in the ancient Near East and the Classical world as well as universal history with a comparative approach. He has published over 150 articles and is editor/co-editor of over 70 volumes.

== Selected publications ==
- Herodots Babylonischer Logos. Eine kritische Untersuchung der Glaubwürdigkeitsdiskussion an Hand ausgewählter Beispiele: Historische Parallelüberlieferung – Argumentationen – Archäologischer Befund – Konsequenzen für eine Geschichte Babylons in persischer Zeit, Innsbrucker Beiträge zur Kulturwissenschaft 84, Innsbruck 1993. ISBN 9783851241655
- Frühformen historischen Denkens. Geschichtsdenken, Ideologie und Propaganda im alten Mesopotamien am Übergang von der Ur-III zur Isin-Larsa Zeit (Alter Orient und Altes Testament 263), Münster. ISBN 9783927120761
- Alexander und die großen Ströme. Die Flussüberquerungen im Lichte altorientalischer Pioniertechniken (Classica et Orientalia 7), Wiesbaden 2013. ISBN 9783447069274
- Robert Rollinger and Christoph Ulf (eds.), Das Archaische Griechenland: Interne Entwicklungen – Externe Impulse, Berlin 2004. ISBN 9783050036816
- Bruno Jacobs and Robert Rollinger (eds.), Der achaimenidische Hof / The Achaemenid Court (Classica et Orientalia 2), Wiesbaden 2010. ISBN 9783447061599
- Giovanni Lanfranchi and Robert Rollinger (eds.), Concepts of Kingship in Antiquity. Proceedings of the European Science Foundation Preparatory Workshop Held in Padova, November 28 – December 1, 2007 (HANE/M X), Padua 2010. ISBN 9788895672014
- Robert Rollinger and Christoph Ulf (eds.), Lag Troia in Kilikien? Der aktuelle Streit um Homers Ilias, Darmstadt 2011. ISBN 9783534232086
- Robert Rollinger, Brigitte Truschnegg and Reinhold Bichler (eds.), Herodot und das Persische Weltreich – Herodotus and the Persian Empire (Classica et Orientalia 3) Harrassowitz-Verlag Wiesbaden 2011. ISBN 9783447193931
- Johannes Haubold, Giovanni B. Lanfranchi, Robert Rollinger, John Steele (eds.), The World of Berossos (Classica et Orientalia 5), Wiesbaden 2013. ISBN 9783447067287
- Michael Gehler and Robert Rollinger (eds.), Imperien in der Weltgeschichte. Epochenübergreifende und globalhistorische Vergleiche, 2 Volumes, Wiesbaden 2014. ISBN 9783447065672
- Giovanni Battista Lanfranchi, Raija Mattila, and Robert Rollinger (eds.), Writing Neo-Assyrian History. Sources, Problems, and Approaches (State Archives of Assyria Studies 29), Penn State University Press 2019. ISBN 9789521095023
- Kai Ruffing, Kerstin Droß-Krüpe, Sebastian Fink, Robert Rollinger (eds.), Societies at War (Melammu Symposia 10), Vienna: Austrian Academy of Sciences Press 2020. ISBN 9783700185727
- Robert Rollinger, Julian Degen and Michael Gehler (eds.), Short-term empires in World History (Universalund kulturhistorische Studien / Studies in Universal and Cultural History), Wiesbaden: Springer 2020. ISBN 9783658294342
- Bruno Jacobs and Robert Rollinger (eds.), A Companion to the Persian Achaemenid Empire, 2 volumes (Blackwell Companions to the Ancient World), Malden: John Wiley & Sons 2021, in press.
