= Arameans =

Ancient Semitic people in the Near East

The Arameans, or Aramaeans (Hebrew: אֲרַמִּים, romanized: ʾĂrammîm; Ancient Greek: Ἀραμαῖοι, romanized: Aramaíoi; Classical Syriac: ܐܪ̈ܡܝܐ, romanized: ārāmāyē, Syriac pronunciation: [ʔɑːrɑːˈmɑːje]), were a tribal Semitic people in the ancient Near East, first documented in historical sources from the late 12th century BCE. Their homeland, often referred to as the land of Aram, originally covered central regions of what is now Syria.

The Arameans were not a single nation or group; Aram was a region with local centers of power spread throughout the Levant. That makes it almost impossible to establish a coherent ethnic category of "Aramean" based on extralinguistic identity markers, such as material culture, lifestyle, or religion. The people of Aram were called "Arameans" in Assyrian texts and the Hebrew Bible, but the terms "Aramean" and "Aram" were never used by later Aramean dynasts to refer to themselves or their country, except the king of Aram-Damascus, since his kingdom was also called Aram. "Arameans" is an appellation of the geographical term Aram given to 1st millennium BCE inhabitants of Syria.

At the beginning of the 1st millennium BCE, the Syro-Hittite states were established throughout the ancient Near East. The most notable was Aram-Damascus, which reached its height in the second half of the 9th century BCE during the reign of King Hazael. During the 8th century BCE, local Aramaean city-states were conquered by the Neo-Assyrian Empire. The policy of population displacement and relocation applied throughout Assyrian domains also affected the Arameans, many of whom were resettled by Assyrian authorities. That caused a wider dispersion of Aramean communities throughout various regions of the Near East, and the range of Aramaic also widened. It gained significance and eventually became the lingua franca of public life and administration as Imperial Aramaic, particularly during the periods of the Neo-Babylonian Empire (612–539 BCE) and the Achaemenid Empire (539–330 BCE).

Before Christianity, Aramaic-speaking communities had undergone considerable Hellenization and Romanization in the Near East. Thus, their integration into the Greek-speaking world had begun a long time before Christianity became established. Some scholars suggest that Arameans who accepted Christianity were referred to as Syrians by the Greeks. The early Muslim conquests in the 7th century were followed by the Islamization and the gradual Arabization (re-Semiticization after centuries of Hellenization, Persianization and Romanization) of Aramaic-speaking communities throughout the Near East. That ultimately resulted in their fragmentation and acculturation. Today, their cultural and linguistic heritage continues to be recognized by some Syriac-Christian or Neo-Aramaic speaking groups, such as the Maronites and the Aramean inhabitants of Maaloula and Jubb'adin near Damascus in Syria.

== Etymology ==
The toponym A-ra-mu appears in an inscription at the East Semitic-speaking kingdom of Ebla listing geographical names, and the term Armi, the Eblaite term for nearby Idlib, occurs frequently in the Ebla tablets (c. 2300 BCE). One of the annals of Naram-Sin of Akkad (c. 2250 BCE) mentions that he captured "Dubul, the ensí of A-ra-me" (Arame is seemingly a genitive form), in the course of a campaign against Simurrum in the northern mountains. Other early references to a place or people of "Aram" have appeared at the archives of Mari (c. 1900 BCE) and at Ugarit (c. 1300 BCE). There is no consensus on the origin and meaning of the word "Aram", one of the most accepted suggestions being that it is derived from a Semitic root rwm, "to be high". A newer suggestion is that it as a broken plural meaning "white antelopes" or "white bulls". The earliest undisputed historical attestation of Arameans as a people appears much later, in the inscriptions of Tiglath-Pileser I (c. 1100 BCE).

== History ==
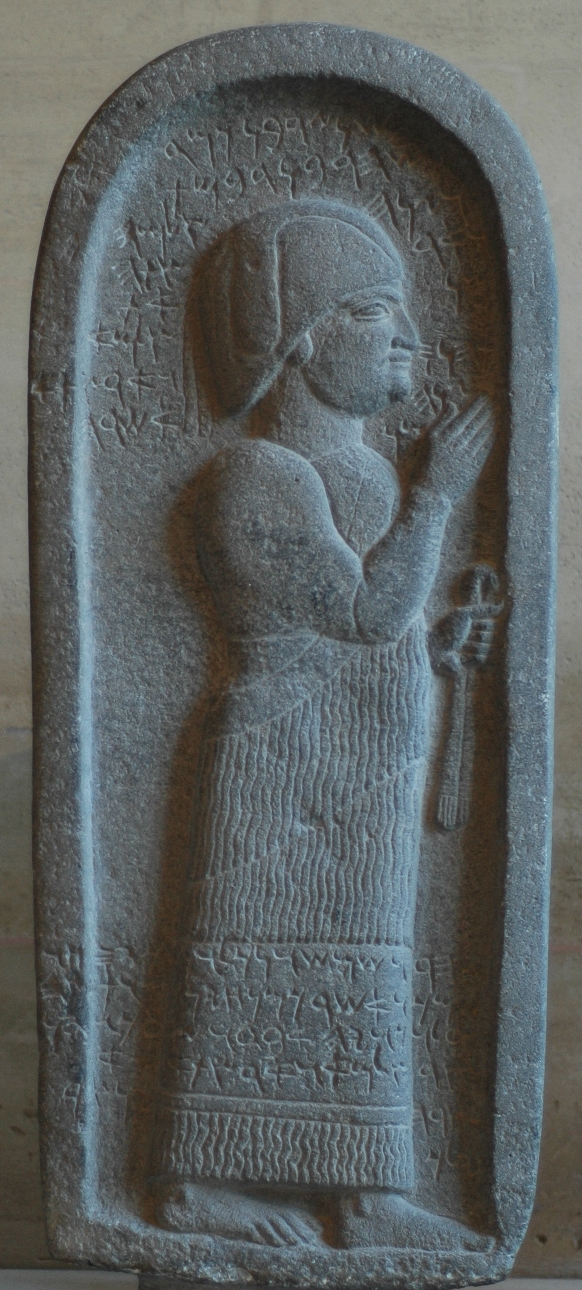
Sin zir Ibni inscription

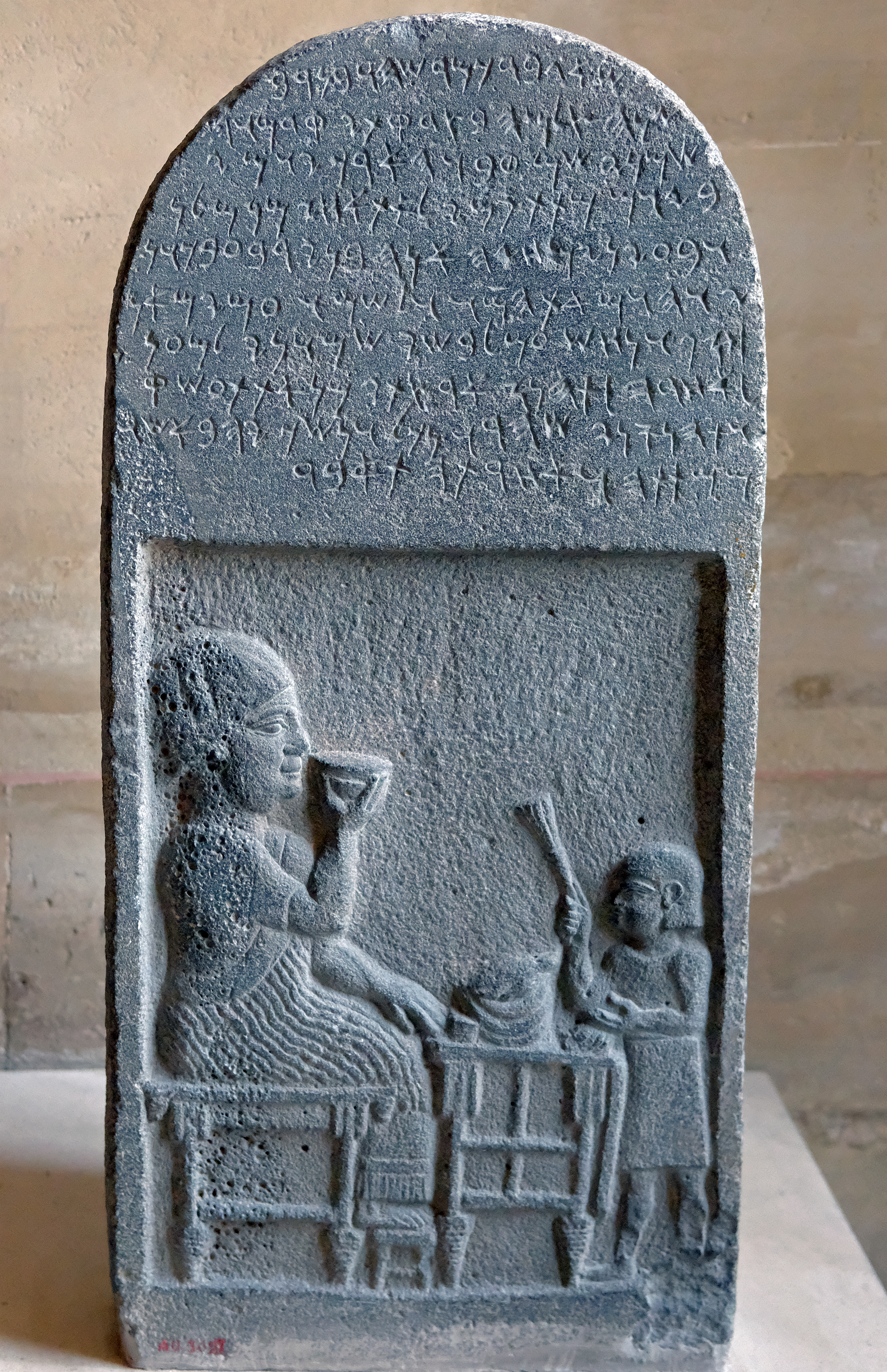
Si Gabbor stele

The Neirab steles, a pair of 7th century BC Aramaic inscriptions found in 1891 in Al-Nayrab near Aleppo, Syria.

=== Origins ===
Although proving the origins of the ancient Arameans has been problematic in the past, scholars have come to a consensus that their homeland was the deserts of Syria and upper Mesopotamia. Nomadic pastoralists have long played a prominent role in the history and economy of the Middle East, but their numbers seem to vary according to climatic conditions and the force of neighbouring states inducing permanent settlement. The Late Bronze Age seems to coincide with increasing aridity, which weakened neighbouring states and induced transhumance pastoralists to spend longer and longer periods with their flocks. Urban settlements (hitherto largely inhabited by Amorite, Canaanite, Hittite, and Ugarite peoples) in the Levant diminished in size until fully-nomadic pastoralist lifestyles came to dominate much of the region. The highly mobile competitive tribesmen, with their sudden raids, continually threatened long-distance trade and interfered with the collection of taxes and tribute.

The people who had long been the prominent population in what is now Syria (called the Land of the Amurru during their tenure) were the Amorites, a Northwest Semitic-speaking people who had appeared during the 25th century BCE, destroyed the hitherto dominant state of Ebla, founded the powerful state of Mari in the Levant and during the 19th century BCE also Babylonia, in southern Mesopotamia. However, they seem to have been displaced or wholly absorbed by the appearance of a people called the Ahlamu by the 13th century BCE and disappear from history. Ahlamû appears to be a generic term for Semitic wanderers and nomads of varying origins who appeared during the 13th century BCE across the ancient Near East, the Arabian Peninsula, Asia Minor, and Egypt.

The Arameans would appear to be one part of the larger generic Ahlamû group rather than synonymous with the Ahlamu. The presence of the Ahlamû is attested during the Middle Assyrian Empire (1365–1020 BCE), which already ruled many of the lands in which the Ahlamû arose in the Babylonian city of Nippur and even at Dilmun. Shalmaneser I (1274–1245 BCE) is recorded as having defeated Shattuara, King of the Mitanni and his Hittite and Ahlamû mercenaries. In the next century, the Ahlamû cut the road from Babylon to Hattusas. Also, Tukulti-Ninurta I (1244–1208 BCE) conquered Mari, Hanigalbat and Rapiqum on the Euphrates and "the mountain of the Ahlamû", apparently the region of Jebel Bishri in northern Syria.

=== Aramean states ===
Map of the Aramean states and other post-Hittite states

The emergence of the Arameans occurred during the Bronze Age collapse (1200–900 BC), which saw great upheavals and mass movements of peoples across the Middle East, Asia Minor, the Caucasus, the East Mediterranean, North Africa, Ancient Iran, Ancient Greece and the Balkans and led to the genesis of new peoples and polities across those regions. The Middle Assyrian Empire (1365–1050 BC), which had dominated the Near East and Asia Minor since the first half of the 14th century BC, began to shrink rapidly after the death of Ashur-bel-kala, its last great ruler in 1056 BC. The Assyrian withdrawal allowed the Arameans and others to gain independence and take firm control of Eber-Nari in the late 11th century BC.

Some of the major Aramean-speaking city states included Aram-Damascus, Hamath, Bet-Adini, Bet-Bagyan, Bit-Hadipe, Aram-Bet Rehob, Aram-Zobah, Bet-Zamani, Bet-Halupe, and Aram-Ma'akah, as well as the Aramean tribal polities of the Gambulu, Litau and Puqudu. Akkermans and Schwartz note that in assessing Luwian and Aramean states in ancient Syria, the existing information on the ethnic composition of the regional states in ancient Syria primarily concerns the rulers and so the ethnolingustic situation of the majority of the population of the states is unclear. They, and other scholars, suggest that the material culture shows no distinctions between states dominated by the Luwians or the Arameans.

Aramean tribal groups were identified by family names that often began with the Semitic prefix Bit, meaning "house of", such as "Bit Adini". This naming convention was influenced by the writing system used by the coastal Phoenicians. Each tribe's name signified the house or ancestral lineage to which it belonged. The term "Aram" sometimes referred only to a part and other times to the whole of the Syrian region during the Iron Age. The expressions "All Aram" and "Upper and Lower Aram" in Sefire treaty inscriptions have been variously interpreted, but can suggest a degree of political and cultural unity among some of the polities in the area. In earlier Assyrian sources from the late 2nd millennium BC references are made to "the land of the Arameans", while in 1st millennium BC references, "Aram" became a topographical term. Aram extended eastward from the Anti-Lebanon Mountains to past the Euphrates.

Biblical sources tell that Saul, David and Solomon (late 11th to 10th centuries BC) fought against the small Aramean states ranged across the northern frontier of Israel: Aram-Sôvah in the Beqaa, Aram-Bêt-Rehob (Rehov) and Aram-Ma'akah around Mount Hermon, Geshur in the Hauran, and Aram-Damascus. An Aramean king's account dating at least two centuries later, the Tel Dan stele, was discovered in northern Israel and is famous for being perhaps the earliest non-Israelite extra-biblical historical reference to the Israelite royal dynasty, the House of David. In the early 11th century BC, much of Israel came under foreign rule for eight years according to the Book of Judges until Othniel defeated the forces led by Cushan-Rishathaim, who was titled in the Bible as ruler of Aram-Naharaim.

Further north, the Arameans gained possession of Neo-Hittite Hamath on the Orontes River and became strong enough to dissociate with the Indo-European-speaking Neo-Hittite states. The Arameans, together with the Edomites and the Ammonites, attacked Israel in the early 11th century BC, but were defeated.

During the 11th and the 10th centuries BC, the Arameans conquered Sam'al and renamed it Bît-Agushi. They also conquered Til Barsip, which became the chief town of Bît-Adini, also known as Beth Eden. North of Sam'al was the Aramean state of Bit Gabbari, which was sandwiched between the Luwian states of Carchemish, Gurgum, Khattina, Unqi and Tabal. One of their earliest semi-independent kingdoms in northern Mesopotamia was Bît-Bahiâni (Tell Halaf).

=== Under Neo-Assyrian rule ===
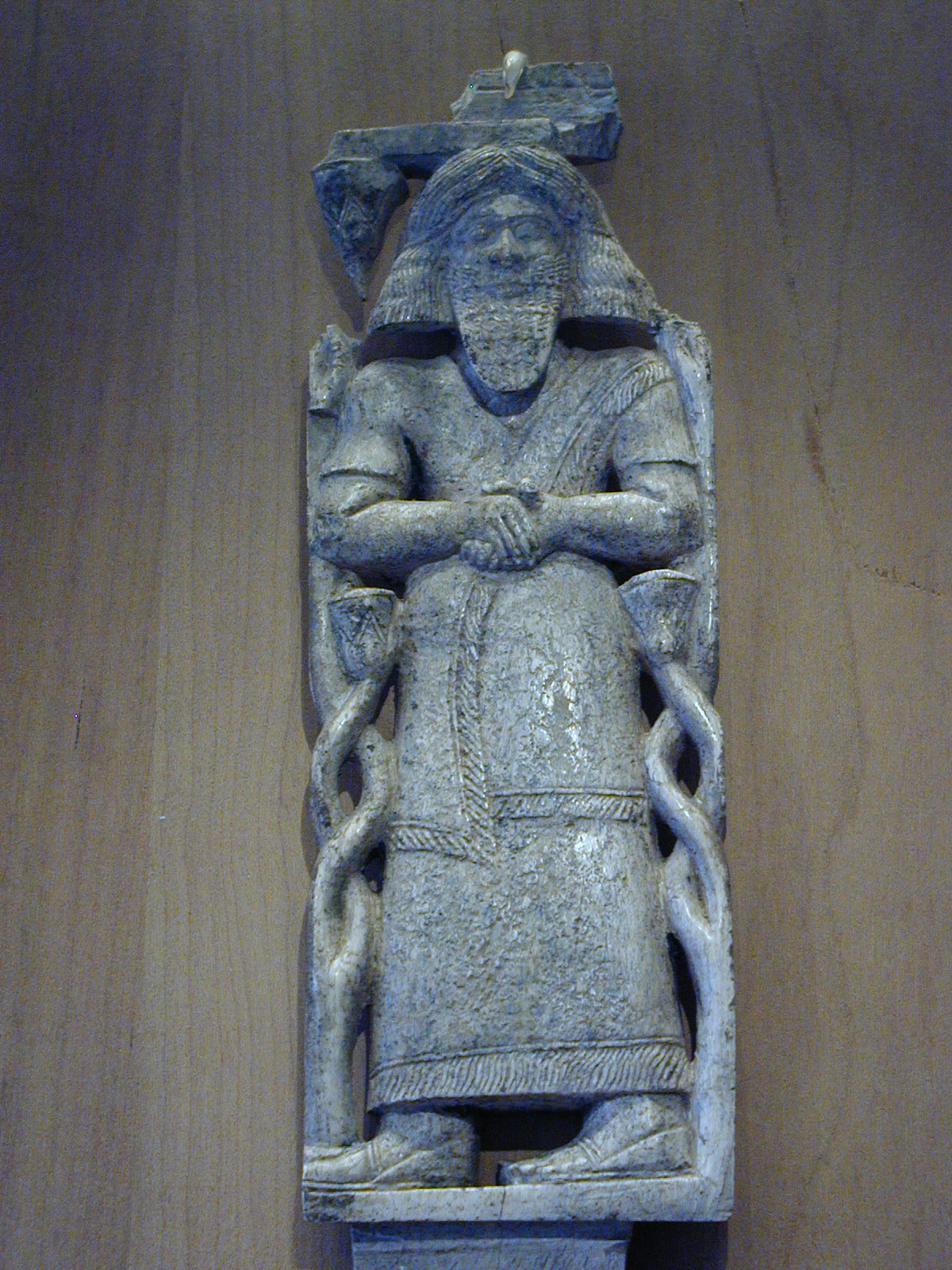
Aramean king Hazael of Aram-Damascus

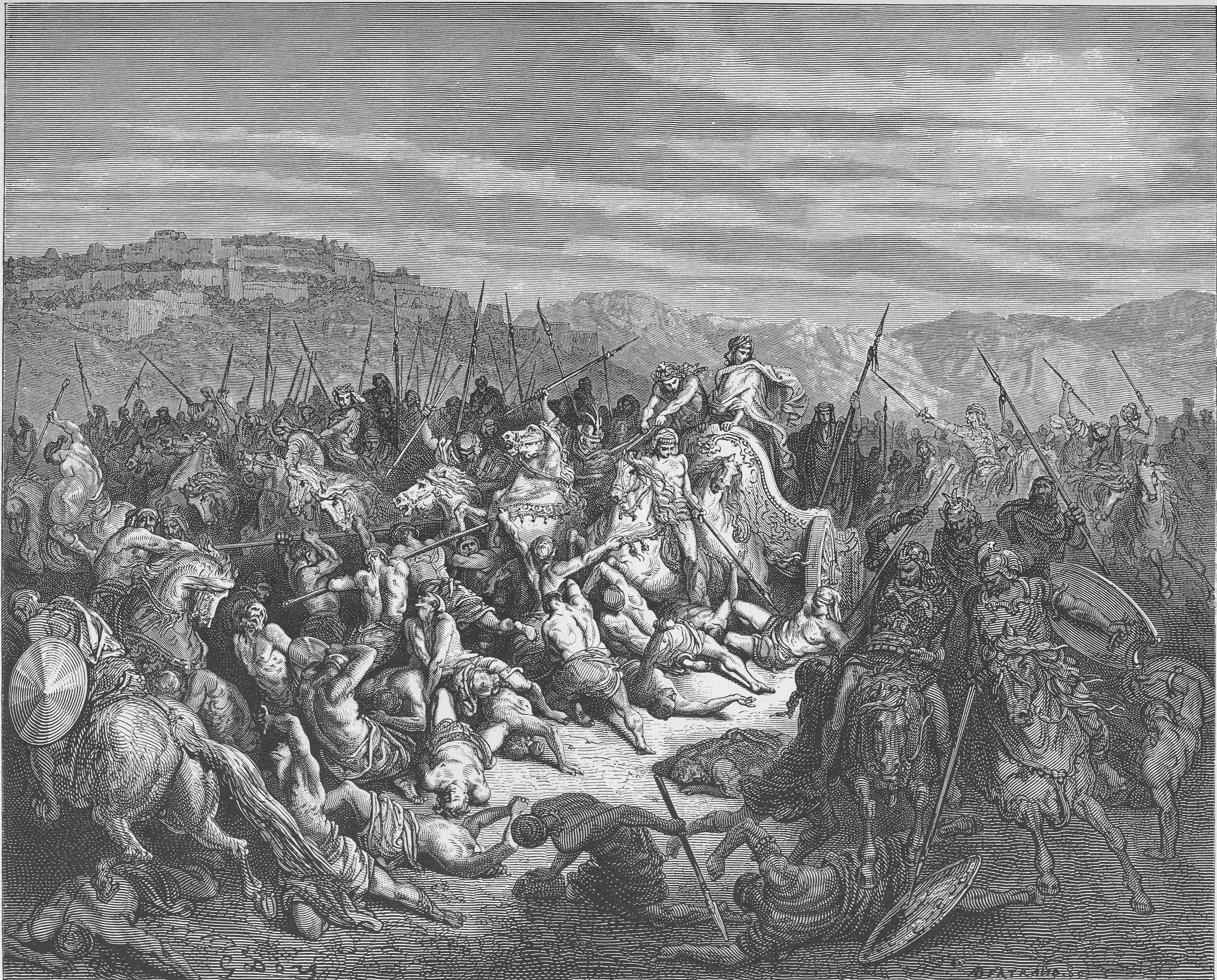
Illustration by Gustave Doré from the 1866 La Sainte Bible depicting an Israelite victory over the army of Ben-Hadad, described in 1 Kings 20:26–34

The first certain reference to the Arameans appears in an Assyrian inscription of Tiglath-Pileser I, designating them as the 'Ahlamu of the land Armaya.' Shortly afterward, the Ahlamû disappear from Assyrian annals and are replaced by the Arameans (Aramu, Arimi). That indicates that the Arameans had risen to dominance amongst the nomads. Among scholars, the relationship between the Akhlame and the Arameans is a matter of conjecture. By the late 12th century BC, the Arameans had been firmly established in Syria; however, they were conquered by the Middle Assyrian Empire.

Assyrian annals from the end of the Middle Assyrian Empire c. 1050 BC and the rise of the Neo-Assyrian Empire in 911 BC contain numerous descriptions of battles between Arameans and the Assyrian army. The Assyrians launched repeated raids into Aramean lands, Babylonia, Ancient Iran, Elam, Asia Minor, and even as far as the Mediterranean to keep its trade routes open. The Aramean city-states, like much of the Near East and Asia Minor, were subjugated by the Neo-Assyrian Empire from the reign of Adad-nirari II in 911 BC, who cleared Arameans and other tribal peoples from the borders of Assyria and began to expand in all directions. The process was continued by Ashurnasirpal II and his son Shalmaneser III, who destroyed many of the small Aramean tribes and conquered Aramean lands for the Assyrians.

In 732 BC, Aram-Damascus fell and was conquered by Assyrian King Tiglath-Pileser III. The Assyrians named their Aramean colonies Eber Nari, but still used the term "Aramean" to describe many of its peoples. The Assyrians conducted forced deportations of hundreds of thousands of Arameans to both Assyria and Babylonia, where a migrant population already existed. Conversely, the Aramaic language was adopted as the lingua franca of the Neo-Assyrian Empire in the 8th century BC, and the native Assyrians and Babylonians began to make a gradual language shift towards Aramaic as the most common language of public life and administration.

The Neo-Assyrian Empire descended into a series of brutal internal wars from 626 BC that weakened it greatly. That allowed a coalition of many its former subject peoples (Babylonians, Chaldeans, Medes, Persians, Parthians, Scythians, Sagartians and Cimmerians) to attack Assyria in 616 BC, sack Nineveh in 612 BC and finally defeat it between 605 and 599 BC. During the war against Assyria, hordes of horse-borne Scythian and Cimmerian marauders ravaged through the Levant and all the way into Egypt.

As a result of migratory processes, various Aramean groups were settled throughout the ancient Near East, and their presence is recorded in the regions of Assyria, Babylonia, Anatolia, Phoenicia, Palestine, Egypt and Northern Arabia. Population transfers, conducted during the Neo-Assyrian Empire and followed by the gradual linguistic Aramaization of non-Aramean populations, created a specific situation in the regions of Assyria proper among ancient Assyrians, who originally spoke the ancient Assyrian language, a dialect of Akkadian, but later accepted Aramaic.

=== Neo-Babylonian Empire ===
Eber-Nari was then ruled by the succeeding Neo-Babylonian Empire, which was initially headed by a short-lived Chaldean dynasty. The Aramean regions became a battleground between the Babylonians and the 26th Dynasty of Egypt, which had been installed by the Assyrians as vassals after they had defeated and ejected the previous Nubian-ruled 25th Dynasty. The Egyptians, having entered the region in a belated attempt to aid their former Assyrian masters, fought the Babylonians, initially with the help of remnants of the Assyrian army, in the region for decades before they were finally vanquished.

The Babylonians remained masters of the Aramean lands only until 539 BC, when the Persian Achaemenid Empire overthrew Nabonidus, the Assyrian-born last king of Babylon, who had himself overthrown the Chaldean dynasty in 556 BC.

=== Under Achaemenid and Hellenistic rule ===
The Arameans were later conquered by the Achaemenid Empire (539–332 BC). However, little changed from the Neo-Assyrian and Neo-Babylonian times, as the Persians, seeing themselves as successors of previous empires, maintained Imperial Aramaic as the main language of public life and administration. Provincial administrative structures also remained the same, and the name Eber Nari still applied to the region.

The conquests of Alexander the Great marked the beginning of a new era in the history of the entire Near East, including the regions inhabited by Arameans. By the late 4th century BC, two newly created Hellenistic states emerged as main pretenders for regional supremacy: the Seleucid Empire (305–64 BC) and the Ptolemaic Empire (305–30 BC). Since earlier times, ancient Greeks commonly used "Syrian" labels as designations for Arameans and heir lands, but it was during the Hellenistic (Seleucid–Ptolemaic) period that the term "Syria" was finally defined to designate the regions west of the Euphrates, as opposed to the term "Assyria", which designated the regions further east.

In the 3rd century BC, various narratives related to the history of earlier Aramean states became accessible to wider audiences after the translation of the Hebrew Bible into the Greek language. Known as Septuagint, the translation was created in Alexandria, the capital of Ptolemaic Egypt that was the most important city of the Hellenistic world and was one of the main centres of Hellenization. Influenced by Greek terminology, translators decided to adopt ancient Greek custom of using "Syrian" labels as designations for Arameans and their lands and thus abandon the endonymic (native) terms that were used in the Hebrew Bible. In Septuagint, the region of Aram was commonly labelled as "Syria", and the Arameans were labelled as "Syrians". When reflecting on traditional influences of Greek terminology on English translations of the Septuagint, American orientalist Robert W. Rogers noted in 1921 that it was unfortunate that the change also affected later English versions. In Greek sources, two writers spoke particularly clearly on the Arameans. Posidonius, born in Apamea, as quoted by Strabo, writes: "Those people whom we Greeks call Syrioi, call themselves Aramaioi". Further, Josephus, who was born in Jerusalem, defines the regions of "Aram's sons" as the Tranchonitis, Damascus "midway between Palestine and Coelo-Syria", Armenia, Bactria, and the Mesene around Spasini Charax.

=== Early Christianity and Arab conquest ===
The ancient Arameans maintained close relationships with other societies in the region. Throughout much of their history, they were heavily influenced by the cuneiform culture of Mesopotamia and the surrounding areas. Bilingual texts in Aramaic and Late Assyrian are among the earliest examples of Aramaic writing. In the western regions, Aramean states had close contact with Phoenicia, the Kingdom of Israel, Kingdom of Judah, and northern Arabia. The Phoenician god Baʿalšamem was even incorporated.

Identifying distinct elements of the Aramean heritage in later periods is challenging. For example, the earliest Syriac legal documents contain legal formulae that could be considered Aramean, but they could also as Neo-Assyrian or Neo-Babylonian.

After the establishment of Roman Syria in the 1st century BC, historically Aramean lands became the frontier region between two empires, Roman and Parthian, and later between their successor states, the Byzantine and Sasanid Empires. Several minor states also existed in frontier regions, most notably the Kingdom of Osroene, centred in the city of Edessa, known in Aramaic as Urhay. However, it is not easy to trace Aramean elements in Edessan culture in either the pre-Christian or the Christian periods.

During Late Antiquity and the Early Middle Ages, the Greek custom of using Syrian terms for Aramaic speakers and their languages gained acceptance among Aramaic-speaking literary and ecclesiastical elites. The practice of using Syrian labels as designations for Aramaic-speakers and their language was very common among ancient Greeks, and under their influence, the practice also became common among the Romans and Byzantines.

An Arabization process was initiated after the early Muslim conquests in the 7th century. In the religious sphere of life, Aramaic-speaking Christians such as the Melkites in Palestine were Islamised, which created a base for gradual acceptance of the Arabic language, not only as the dominant language of Islamic prayer and worship, but also as a common language of public and domestic life. The acceptance of Arabic became the main vessel of the gradual Arabization of Aramaic-speaking communities throughout the Near East and ultimately resulted in their fragmentation and acculturation. Those processes affected not only Islamized Aramaic speakers, but also some of those who remained Christians, creating local communities of Arabic-speaking Christians of Syriac Christian origin who spoke Arabic in their public and domestic life while continuing to belong to churches that used liturgical Syriac.

In the 10th century, the Byzantine Empire gradually reconquered much of northern Syria and upper Mesopotamia, including the cities of Melitene (934) and Antioch (969) and thus liberated local Aramaic-speaking Christian communities from the Muslim rule. Byzantines favoured Eastern Orthodoxy, but the leadership of the Antiochian Oriental Orthodox Patriarchate succeeded in reaching agreement with the Byzantine authorities and thus secured religious tolerance. The Byzantines extended their rule up to Edessa (1031), but were forced into a general retreat from Syria during the course of the 11th century and were pushed back by the newly-arrived Seljuk Turks, who took Antioch (1084). The later establishment of Crusader states (1098), the Principality of Antioch and the County of Edessa, created new challenges for local Aramaic-speaking Christians, both Oriental Orthodox and Eastern Orthodox.

== Culture ==
The Iron Age culture of Syria is a topic of interest among scholars, but is never referred to simply as "Aramean". Scholars have difficulty in identifying and isolating characteristic Aramean elements in the culture. Even in North Syria, where more substantial evidence is available, scholars still find it difficult to identify what is genuinely Aramean from what is borrowed from other cultures. Widespread scholarly opinion still maintains that since several ethnic groups, such as Luwians and Aramaeans, interacted in the region, one material culture with "mixed" elements resulted. The material culture appears to be so homogeneous that it "shows no clear distinctions between states dominated by Luwians or Aramaeans".

=== Language ===
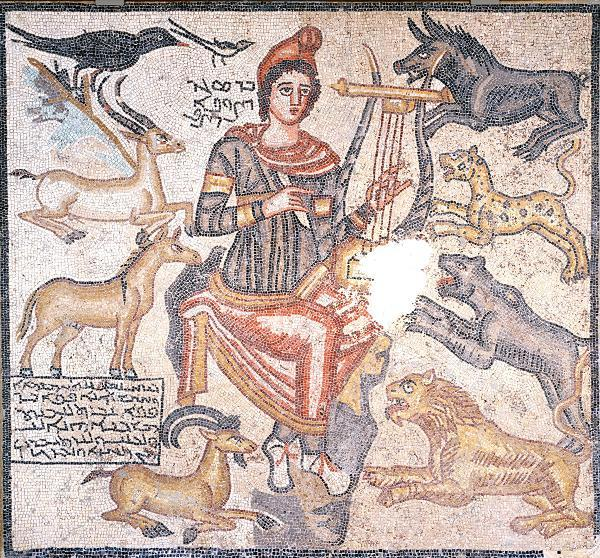
Ancient mosaic from Edessa in Osroene (2nd century AD) with inscriptions in early Edessan Aramaic

Initial area of the Aramaic language in the 1st century, and its gradual decline

Arameans were mostly defined by their use of the West Semitic Old Aramaic language (1100 BC – 200 AD), which was first written using the Phoenician alphabet, but over time modified to a specifically-Aramaic alphabet. Aramaic first appeared in history during the opening centuries of the Iron Age, when several newly-emerging chiefdoms decided to use it as a written language. The process coincided with a change from syllabic cuneiform to alphabetic scribal culture and the rise of a novel style of public epigraphy, which was formerly unattested in Syria-Palestine. The language is considered a sister branch of the idiom used in the Bronze-Age city-state of Ugarit, on the one hand, and Canaanite, which comprises languages further south in the speech area such as Hebrew, Phoenician, and Moabite, on the other hand. All three branches can be subsumed under the more general rubric Northwest Semitic and thus share a common origin. The earliest direct witnesses of Aramaic, which were composed between the 10th and 8th centuries BC, are unanimously subsumed under the term "Old Aramaic". The early writings exhibit variation and anticipate the enormous linguistic diversity within the Aramaic language group. Despite the variation, they are connected by common literary forms and formulaic expressions.

The language had no linguistic similarities to the Akkadian dialect spoken in Babylonia or Assyria. As early as the 8th century BC, Aramaic competed with the East Semitic Akkadian language and script in Assyria and Babylonia and then spread throughout the Near East in various dialects. By around 800 BC, Aramaic had become the lingua franca of the Neo-Assyrian Empire, which continued during the Achaemenid period as Imperial Aramaic. Although it was marginalized by Greek during the Hellenistic period, Aramaic in its varying dialects remained unchallenged as the common language of all Semitic peoples of the region until the Arabs' Islamic conquest of Mesopotamia in the 7th century AD, when the language became gradually superseded by Arabic.

The vernacular dialects of Eastern Old Aramaic, spoken during the Neo-Assyrian, Neo-Babylonian, and Achaemenid Persian empires, developed into various Eastern Middle Aramaic dialects. Among these were the Aramaic dialects of the ancient region of Osrhoene, one of which later became the liturgical language of Syriac Christianity. In the first centuries AD, the Christian Bible was translated into Aramaic and by the 4th century, the local Aramaic dialect of Edessa (Syriac: Urhay) had evolved into a literary language known as Edessan Aramaic (Syriac: Urhaya). Since Edessan Aramaic (Urhaya) was the primary liturgical language of Aramaic Christianity, it also became known as Edessan Syriac and was later defined by Western scholars as Classical Syriac. This laid the foundation for the term Syriac Christianity. The Eastern Orthodox patriarchates were dominated by Greek episcopate and Greek linguistic and cultural traditions. The use of the Aramaic language in liturgical and literary life among Melkites of Jewish descent persisted throughout the Middle Ages until the 14th century, as exemplified in the use of a specific regional dialect known as Christian Palestinian Aramaic or Palestinian Syriac in the Palestine region, Transjordan and Sinai.

Descendant Neo-Aramaic languages of the Eastern Aramaic branch continue to serve as the spoken and written languages of the Assyrians, Mandeans and Mizrahi Jews. These languages are primarily found in Iraq, northwestern Iran, southeastern Turkey and northeastern Syria, and to a lesser extent, in migrant communities in Armenia, Georgia, Russia, Lebanon, Israel, Jordan and Azerbaijan, as well as in Assyrian diaspora communities in the West, particularly in the United States, Canada, Great Britain, Sweden, Australia and Germany.

Western Neo-Aramaic, the only surviving modern variety of the Western branch, is now spoken by Muslims and Christians solely in Maaloula and Jubb'adin in the Qalamoun mountains of southwestern Syria.

During the early modern period, the study of the Aramaic language, both ancient and modern, was initiated among Western scholars. This led to the formation of Aramaic studies as a broader multidisciplinary field, encompassing the study of the cultural and historical heritage of Aramaic. The linguistic and historical aspects of Aramaic studies have been further expanded since the 19th century through archaeological excavations of ancient sites in the Near East.

=== Religion ===
What is known of the religion of the Aramean groups is derived from excavated objects and temples and by Aramaic literary sources, as well as the names they had. It appears from their inscriptions and their names that the Arameans worshipped Canaanite and Mesopotamian gods such as Hadad, Sin, Shamash and Nergal, and Canaanite deities such as El.

The Arameans who lived outside their homelands apparently followed the traditions of the countries in which they settled. The King of Damascus, for instance, employed Phoenician sculptors and ivory-carvers. In Tell Halaf-Guzana, the palace of Kapara, an Aramean ruler (9th century BC) was decorated with orthostates and with statues that display a mixture of Mesopotamian, Hittite and Hurrian influences.

== Legacy ==
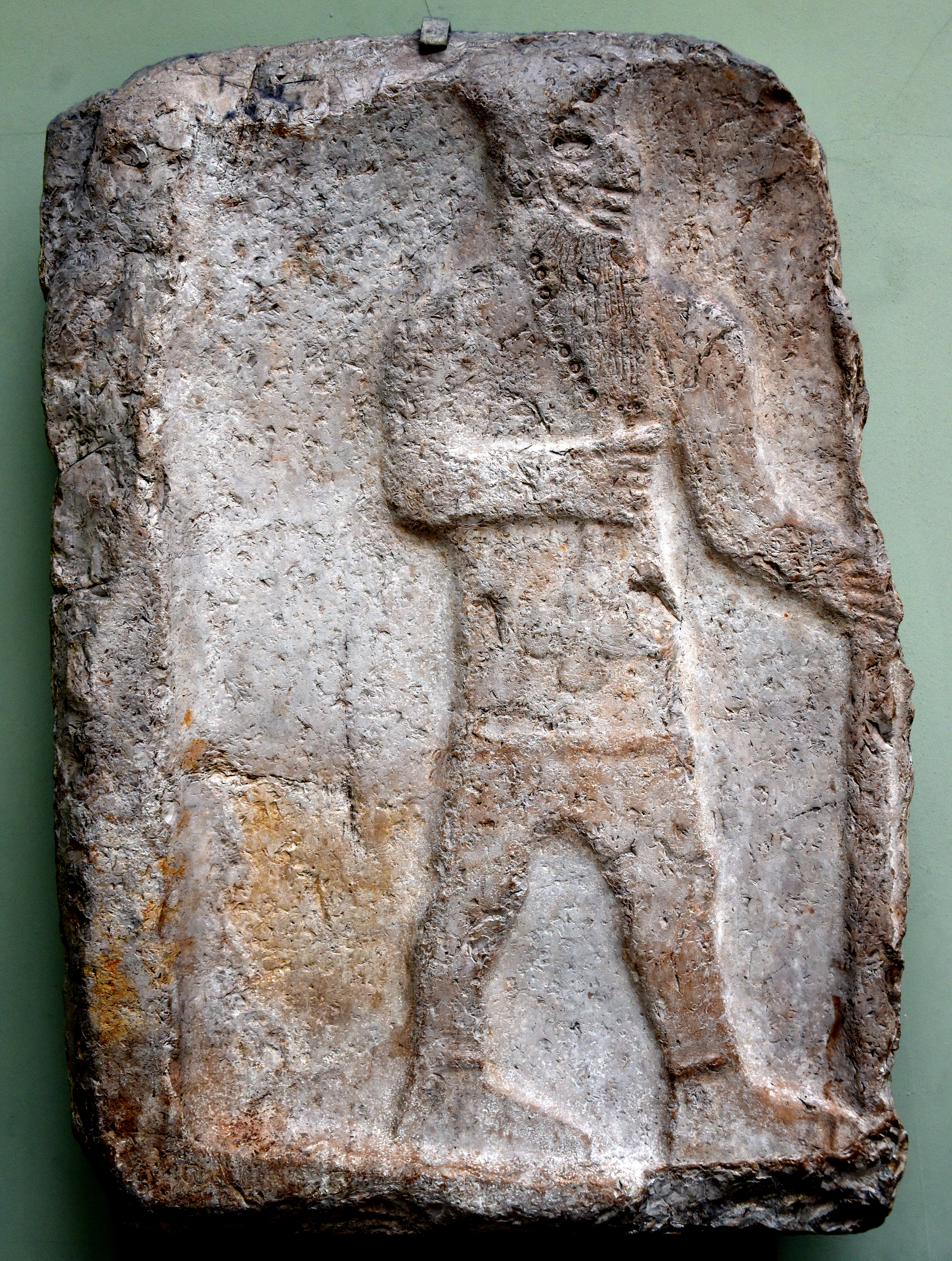
Limestone relief; stele. This unusual stele depicts an unidentified Aramaean king holding a tulip in one hand while grasping a staff or a spear in the other hand. 11th century BC. From Tell es-Salihiyeh, Damascus

The legacy of ancient Arameans became of particular interest for scholars during the early modern period and resulted in the emergence of Aramaic studies as a distinctive field, dedicated to the study of the Aramaic language. By the 19th century, the Aramean question was formulated, and several scholarly theses were proposed regarding the development of the language and the history of the Arameans.

=== Modern identity ===
In modern times, an Aramean identity is held mainly by a number of Syriac Christian groups, predominantly from southeastern Turkey and parts of Syria. Aramean identity is most predominant among Syriac Christians, and as such, is most often used in the diaspora, especially in Germany and Sweden. However, other groups such as Maronites, Arab Christians, and the Arameans of Maaloula and Jubb'adin may also identify strongly under the label.

In 2014, Israel officially recognised Arameans as a distinctive minority. Questions related to the minority rights of Arameans in some other countries were also brought to international attention.

== See also ==
- Aramean kings
- Aram-Damascus
- Israelite-Aramean War
- Neo-Hittite states
- Paddan Aram

== Bibliography ==
=== Books ===
- Akkerman & Schwartz (2003). The Archaeology of Syria: From Complex Hunter-Gatherers to Early Urban Societies (c.16,000–300 BC) (Cambridge World Archaeology). Cambridge University Press; Illustrated edition (February 9, 2004). ISBN 9780521796668.
- Akopian, Arman (2017). Introduction to Aramean and Syriac Studies: A Manual. Piscataway, NJ: Gorgias Handbooks. ISBN 9781463238933.
- Bettany, George T. (1888). The World's Inhabitants. London-New York: Ward, Lock & Co.
- Beyer, Klaus (1986). The Aramaic Language: Its Distribution and Subdivisions. Göttingen: Vandenhoeck & Ruprecht. ISBN 9783525535738.
- Brinkman, John A. (1968). A Political History of Post-Kassite Babylonia, 1158–722 B.C. Roma: Pontificium Institutum Biblicum. ISBN 978-88-7653-243-6.
- Brock, Sebastian P. (1992a) [1985]. The Luminous Eye: The Spiritual World Vision of Saint Ephrem (2nd revised ed.). Kalamazoo: Cistercian Publications. ISBN 9780879075248.
- Courtois, Sebastien de (2004). The Forgotten Genocide: Eastern Christians, the Last Aramaeans. Piscataway, NJ: Gorgias Press. ISBN 9781593330774.
- Drijvers, Hendrik J. W. (1980). Cults and Beliefs at Edessa. Leiden: Brill. ISBN 9004060502.
- Healy, Mark (2023). The Ancient Assyrians: Empire and Army, 883–612 BC. Bloomsbury Publishing. ISBN 978-1-4728-4809-3.
- Gzella, Holger (2015). A Cultural History of Aramaic: From the Beginnings to the Advent of Islam. Leiden-Boston: Brill. ISBN 9789004285101.
- Harrak, Amir, ed. (1999). The Chronicle of Zuqnīn, Parts III and IV: A.D. 488–775. Toronto: Pontifical Institute of Mediaeval Studies. ISBN 9780888442864.
- Hasegawa, Shuichi (2012). Aram and Israel during the Jehuite Dynasty. Berlin-Boston: Walter de Gruyter. ISBN 9783110283488.
- Lipiński, Edward (2000). The Aramaeans: Their Ancient History, Culture, Religion. Leuven: Peeters Publishers. ISBN 9789042908598.
- Minov, Sergey (2020). Memory and Identity in the Syriac Cave of Treasures: Rewriting the Bible in Sasanian Iran. Leiden-Boston: Brill. ISBN 9789004445512.
- Quispel, Gilles (2008). Gnostica, Judaica, Catholica: Collected Essays of Gilles Quispel. Leiden-Boston: Brill. ISBN 9789047441823.
- Rogers, Robert W. (1921). A Book of Old Testament Lessons for Public Reading in Churches. New York: Abingdon Press.
- Roller, Duane W., ed. (2014). The Geography of Strabo: An English Translation, with Introduction and Notes. Cambridge: Cambridge University Press. ISBN 9781139952491.
- Saggs, Henry W. F. (1984). The Might That Was Assyria. London: Sidgwick & Jackson. ISBN 9780312035112.
- Sokoloff, Michael, ed. (1983). Arameans, Aramaic and the Aramaic Literary Tradition. Tel Aviv: Bar Ilan University Press. ISBN 978-965-226-038-3.
- Van-Lennep, Henry J. (1875). Bible Lands: Their Modern Customs and Manners Illustrative of Scripture. New York: Harper & Brothers.
- Wells, Herbert G. (1920). The New and Revised Outline of History. Vol. 1. New York: Macmillan.
- Witakowski, Witold, ed. (1987). The Syriac Chronicle of Pseudo-Dionysius of Tel-Mahrē: A Study in the History of Historiography. Uppsala-Stockholm: University of Uppsala. ISBN 9789155419677.
- Younger, Kenneth Lawson (2016). A Political History of the Arameans: From Their Origins to the End of Their Polities. Atlanta: SBL Press. ISBN 9781628370843.

=== Book chapters ===
- Arav, Rami (2013). "Geshur: The Southwesternmost Aramean Kingdom". Arameans, Chaldeans, and Arabs in Babylonia and Palestine in the First Millennium B.C. Wiesbaden: Harrassowitz Verlag. pp. 1–29. ISBN 9783447065443.
- Beaulieu, Paul-Alain (2013). "Arameans, Chaldeans, and Arabs in Cuneiform Sources from the Late Babylonian Period". Arameans, Chaldeans, and Arabs in Babylonia and Palestine in the First Millennium B.C. Wiesbaden: Harrassowitz Verlag. pp. 31–55.
- Berlejung, Angelika (2014). "Palestine". The Aramaeans in Ancient Syria. Leiden: Brill. pp. 339–365. ISBN 9789004229433.
- Billington, Clyde E. (2005). "Othniel, Cushan-Rishathaim, and the Date of the Exodus". Beyond the Jordan: Studies in Honor of W. Harold Mare. Eugene: Wipf and Stock Publishers. pp. 117–132. ISBN 9781597520690.
- Bonatz, Dominik (2014). "Art". The Aramaeans in Ancient Syria. Leiden: Brill. pp. 205–253. ISBN 9789004229433.
- Botta, Alejandro F. (2014). "Egypt". The Aramaeans in Ancient Syria. Leiden: Brill. pp. 366–377. ISBN 9789004229433.
- Brock, Sebastian P. (1992b). "Eusebius and Syriac Christianity". Eusebius, Christianity, and Judaism. Detroit: Wayne State University Press. pp. 212–234. ISBN 0814323618.
- Brock, Sebastian P. (2011). "Christian Palestinian Aramaic". Gorgias Encyclopedic Dictionary of the Syriac Heritage. Piscataway, NJ: Gorgias Press. pp. 96–97.
- Burnett, Stephen G. (2005). "Christian Aramaism: The Birth and Growth of Aramaic Scholarship in the Sixteenth Century" ( (PDF)). Seeking Out the Wisdom of the Ancients. Winona Lake: Eisenbrauns. pp. 421–436. Archived from the original on 2021-08-27.
- Doak, Brian R. (2020). "The Arameans". Ancient Israel's Neighbors. Oxford University Press. pp. 51–73. ISBN 9780190690632.
- Fales, Frederick M. (2011). "Moving around Babylon: On the Aramean and Chaldean Presence in Southern Mesopotamia". Babylon: Wissenskultur in Orient und Okzident. Berlin-Boston: Walter de Gruyter. pp. 91–112. doi:10.1515/9783110222128.91. ISBN 978-3-11-022211-1.
- Fales, Frederick M. (2017). "Ethnicity in the Assyrian Empire: A View from the Nisbe (III): Arameans and Related Tribalists". At the Dawn of History: Ancient Near Eastern Studies in Honour of J. N. Postgate. Winona Lake: Eisenbrauns. pp. 133–178. ISBN 9781575064710.
- Frame, Grant (2013). "The Political History and Historical Geography of the Aramean, Chaldean, and Arab Tribes in Babylonia in the Neo-Assyrian Period". Arameans, Chaldeans, and Arabs in Babylonia and Palestine in the First Millennium B.C. Wiesbaden: Harrassowitz Verlag. pp. 87–121.
- Frenschkowski, Marco (2019). "Are Syrians Arameans? Some Preliminary Remarks on Syriac Ethnic Identity in Late Antiquity". Research on Israel and Aram: Autonomy, Independence and Related Issues. Tübingen: Mohr Siebeck. pp. 457–484. ISBN 9783161577192.
- Griffith, Sidney H. (2007). "Christian Lore and the Arabic Qur'an: The Companions of the Cave in Surat al-Kahf and in Syriac Christian Tradition". The Quran in its Historical Context. London-New York: Routledge. pp. 109–137. ISBN 9781134109456.
- Gzella, Holger (2014). "Language and Script". The Aramaeans in Ancient Syria. Leiden: Brill. pp. 71–107. ISBN 9789004229433.
- Gzella, Holger (2017). "New Light on Linguistic Diversity in Pre-Achaemenid Aramaic: Wandering Arameans or Language Spread?". Wandering Arameans: Arameans Outside Syria: Textual and Archaeological Perspectives. Wiesbaden: Harrassowitz Verlag. pp. 19–38.
- Harrak, Amir (1998). "Arabisms in Part IV of the Syriac Chronicle of Zuqnin". Symposium Syriacum VII. Roma: Pontificio Istituto Orientale. pp. 469–498. ISBN 9788872103197.
- Hauser, Stefan R. (2019). "The Church of the East until the Eighth Century". The Oxford Handbook of Early Christian Archaeology. New York: Oxford University Press. pp. 431–450. ISBN 978-0-19-936904-1.
- Hausleiter, Arnulf (2016). "The Middle Euphrates, Iraq: Assyrian-Babylonian interactions in an Aramaean territory in the early 1st millennium BC". Parcours d'Orient: Recueil de textes offert à Christine Kepinski. Oxford: Archaeopress publishing. pp. 107–120.
- Healey, John F. (2014). "Aramaean Heritage". The Aramaeans in Ancient Syria. Leiden: Brill. pp. 391–402. ISBN 9789004229433.
- Healey, John F. (2019). "Arameans and Aramaic in Transition – Western Influences and the Roots of Aramean Christianity". Research on Israel and Aram: Autonomy, Independence and Related Issues. Tübingen: Mohr Siebeck. pp. 433–446. ISBN 9783161577192.
- Heinrichs, Wolfhart (1993). "The Modern Assyrians – Name and Nation". Semitica: Serta philologica Constantino Tsereteli dicata. Torino: Zamorani. pp. 99–114. ISBN 9788871580241.
- Jarjour, Tala (2016). "Chant as the Articulation of Christian Aramean Spirithood". The Oxford Handbook of Music and World Christianities. Oxford: Oxford University Press. pp. 187–207. ISBN 9780199859993.
- Kühn, Dagmar (2014). "Society, Institutions, Law, and Economy". The Aramaeans in Ancient Syria. Leiden: Brill. pp. 37–70. ISBN 9789004229433.
- Levin, Yigal (2017). "My Father was a Wandering Aramean: Biblical Views of the Ancestral Relationship between Israel and Aram". Wandering Arameans: Arameans Outside Syria: Textual and Archaeological Perspectives. Wiesbaden: Harrassowitz Verlag. pp. 39–52. doi:10.2307/J.CTVCKQ4PM.8.
- Lemaire, André (2014). "Anatolia". The Aramaeans in Ancient Syria. Leiden: Brill. pp. 319–328. ISBN 9789004229433.
- Niehr, Herbert (2014). "Introduction". The Aramaeans in Ancient Syria. Leiden: Brill. pp. 1–9. ISBN 9789004229433.
- Niehr, Herbert (2014a). "Religion". The Aramaeans in Ancient Syria. Leiden: Brill. pp. 127–203. ISBN 9789004229433.
- Niehr, Herbert (2014b). "Phoenicia". The Aramaeans in Ancient Syria. Leiden: Brill. pp. 329–338. ISBN 9789004229433.
- Niehr, Herbert (2014c). "Northern Arabia". The Aramaeans in Ancient Syria. Leiden: Brill. pp. 378–390. ISBN 9789004229433.
- Nissinen, Martti (2014). "Assyria". The Aramaeans in Ancient Syria. Leiden: Brill. pp. 273–296. ISBN 9789004229433.
- Lipiński, Edward (2013). "The Aramaeans in the West (13th–8th centuries)". Arameans, Chaldeans, and Arabs in Babylonia and Palestine in the First Millennium B.C. Wiesbaden: Harrassowitz Verlag. pp. 123–147. ISBN 9783447065443.
- Merlo, Paolo (2014). "Literature". The Aramaeans in Ancient Syria. Leiden: Brill. pp. 109–125. ISBN 9789004229433.
- Novák, Mirko (2014). "Architecture". The Aramaeans in Ancient Syria. Leiden: Brill. pp. 255–271. ISBN 9789004229433.
- Rompay, Lucas van (1999). "Jacob of Edessa and the Early History of Edessa". After Bardaisan: Studies on Continuity and Change in Syriac Christianity. Louvain: Peeters Publishers. pp. 269–285. ISBN 9789042907355.
- Rubin, Milka (1998). "Arabization versus Islamization in the Palestinian Melkite Community during the Early Muslim Period". Sharing the Sacred: Religious Contacts and Conflicts in the Holy Land: First-fifteenth Centuries CE. Jerusalem: Yad Izhak Ben Zvi. pp. 149–162.
- Sader, Hélène (1992). "The 12th Century B.C. in Syria: The Problem of the Rise of the Aramaeans". The Crisis Years: The 12th Century B.C. from beyond the Danube to the Tigris. Dubuque: Kendall-Hunt. pp. 157–164.
- Sader, Hélène (2000). "The Aramaean Kingdoms of Syria: Origin and Formation Processes". Essays on Syria in the Iron Age. Louvain: Peeters Press. pp. 61–76. ISBN 9789042908789.
- Sader, Hélène (2010). "The Aramaeans of Syria: Some Considerations on their Origin and Material Culture". The Books of Kings: Sources, Composition, Historiography and Reception. Leiden-Boston: Brill. pp. 273–300. ISBN 978-9004177291.
- Sader, Hélène (2014). "History". In Herbert Niehr (ed.). The Aramaeans in Ancient Syria. Leiden: Brill. pp. 11–36. ISBN 9789004229433.
- Sader, Hélène (2016). "The Formation and Decline of the Aramaean States in Iron Age Syria". State Formation and State Decline in the Near and Middle East. Wiesbaden: Harrassowitz Verlag. pp. 61–76. ISBN 9783447105651.
- Salvesen, Alison (2009). "Keeping it in the Family? Jacob and his Aramean Heritage according to Jewish and Christian Sources". The Exegetical Encounter between Jews and Christians in Late Antiquity. Leiden-Boston: Brill. pp. 205–220. ISBN 978-9004177277.
- Sergi, Omer (2017). "The Battle of Ramoth-gilead and the Rise of the Aramean Hegemony in the Southern Levant during the Second Half of the 9th Century BC". Wandering Arameans: Arameans Outside Syria: Textual and Archaeological Perspectives. Wiesbaden: Harrassowitz Verlag. pp. 81–98.
- Sommer, Renate (2012). "The Role of Religious Freedom in the Context of the Accession Negotiations between the European Union and Turkey – The Example of the Arameans". The Slow Disappearance of the Syriacs from Turkey and of the Grounds of the Mor Gabriel Monastery. Münster: LIT Verlag. pp. 157–170. ISBN 9783643902689.
- Spieckermann, Hermann (1999). "Arameans". The Encyclopedia of Christianity. Vol. 1. Grand Rapids: Eerdmans. pp. 114–115.
- Streck, Michael P. (2014). "Babylonia". The Aramaeans in Ancient Syria. Leiden: Brill. pp. 297–318. ISBN 9789004229433.
- Teule, Herman G. B. (2012). "Who Are the Syriacs?". The Slow Disappearance of the Syriacs from Turkey and of the Grounds of the Mor Gabriel Monastery. Münster: LIT Verlag. pp. 47–56. ISBN 9783643902689.
- Vittmann, Günter (2017). "Arameans in Egypt". Wandering Arameans: Arameans Outside Syria: Textual and Archaeological Perspectives. Wiesbaden: Harrassowitz Verlag. pp. 229–280.
- Weltecke, Dorothea (2006). "On the Syriac Orthodox in the Principality of Antioch during the Crusader Period" (PDF). East and West in the Medieval Eastern Mediterranean I: Antioch from the Byzantine Reconquest until the End of the Crusader Principality. Leuven: Peeters Publishers. pp. 95–124.
- Wevers, John W. (2001). "Aram and Aramaean in the Septuagint". The World of the Aramaeans. Vol. 1. Sheffield: Sheffield Academic Press. pp. 237–251. ISBN 9781841271583.
- Woźniak, Marta (2012). "Far from Aram-Nahrin: The Suryoye Diaspora Experience". Border Terrains: World Diasporas in the 21st Century. Oxford: United Kingdom Inter-Disciplinary Press. pp. 73–83. ISBN 9781848881174.
- Wunsch, Cornelia (2013). "Glimpses on the Lives of Deportees in Rural Babylonia.". Arameans, Chaldeans, and Arabs in Babylonia and Palestine in the First Millennium B.C. Wiesbaden: Harrassowitz Verlag. pp. 247–260.
- Younger, Kenneth Lawson (2007). "The Late Bronze Age/Iron Age Transition and the Origins of the Arameans". Ugarit at Seventy-Five. Winona Lake: Eisenbrauns. pp. 131–174. ISBN 9781575061436.
- Younger, Kenneth Lawson (2014). "War and Peace in the Origins of the Arameans". Krieg und Frieden im Alten Vorderasien. Münster: Ugarit Verlag. pp. 861–874.
- Younger, Kenneth Lawson (2017). "Tiglath-Pileser I and the Initial Conflicts of the Assyrians with the Arameans". Wandering Arameans: Arameans Outside Syria: Textual and Archaeological Perspectives. Wiesbaden: Harrassowitz Verlag. pp. 195–228.
- Younger, Kenneth Lawson (2020). "Reflections on Hazael's Empire in Light of Recent Study in the Biblical and Ancient Near Eastern Texts". Writing and Rewriting History in Ancient Israel and Near Eastern Cultures. Wiesbaden: Harrassowitz Verlag. pp. 79–102. ISBN 9783447113632.
- Zadok, Ran (2013). "The Onomastics of the Chaldean, Aramean, and Arabian Tribes in Babylonia during the First Millennium". Arameans, Chaldeans, and Arabs in Babylonia and Palestine in the First Millennium B.C. Wiesbaden: Harrassowitz Verlag. pp. 261–336. ISBN 9783447065443.

=== Journal articles ===
- Arnold, Bill T. (2011). "Aramean Origins: The Evidence from Babylonia". Archiv für Orientforschung. 52: 179–185.
- Aufrecht, Walter E. (2001). "A Legacy of Syria: The Aramaic Language". Bulletin of the Canadian Society for Mesopotamian Studies. 36: 145–155.
- Bcheiry, Iskandar (2010). "The Arabization Process in Upper Mesopotamia in the Eighth Century A.D.: The Case of the Mosulis in the Chronicle of Zūqnīn". Parole de l'Orient. 35: 455–475.
- Bowman, Raymond A. (1948). "Arameans, Aramaic, and the Bible". Journal of Near Eastern Studies. 7 (2): 65–90. doi:10.1086/370861. JSTOR 542672. S2CID 162226854.
- Brinkman, John A. (1977). "Notes on Arameans and Chaldeans in Southern Babylonia in the Early Seventh Century B.C." Orientalia. 46 (2): 304–325. JSTOR 43074768.
- Brock, Sebastian P. (1989). "Three Thousand Years of Aramaic Literature". ARAM Periodical. 1 (1): 11–23.
- Brock, Sebastian P. (1999). "St. Ephrem in the Eyes of Later Syriac Liturgical Tradition" (PDF). Hugoye: Journal of Syriac Studies. 2 (1): 5–25. doi:10.31826/hug-2010-020103. S2CID 212688898.
- Coyne, John J. A. (1914). "Hellenism and the Aramean People". Studies: An Irish Quarterly Review. 3 (10): 64–91. JSTOR 30092466.
- D'Agostino, Anacleto (2009). "The Assyrian-Aramaean interaction in the upper Khabur: The archaeological evidence from Tell Barri Iron Age layers". Syria. 86 (86): 17–41. doi:10.4000/syria.507. hdl:11568/954680. JSTOR 20723917.
- Debié, Muriel (2009). "Syriac Historiography and Identity Formation". Church History and Religious Culture. 89 (1–3): 93–114. doi:10.1163/187124109X408014.
- Frye, Richard N. (1992). "Assyria and Syria: Synonyms". Journal of Near Eastern Studies. 51 (4): 281–285. doi:10.1086/373570. JSTOR 545826. S2CID 161323237.
- Greenfield, Jonas C. (1976). "The Aramean God Rammān/Rimmōn". Israel Exploration Journal. 26 (4): 195–198. JSTOR 27925588.
- Griffith, Sidney H. (1997). "From Aramaic to Arabic: The Languages of the Monasteries of Palestine in the Byzantine and Early Islamic Periods". Dumbarton Oaks Papers. 51: 11–31. doi:10.2307/1291760. JSTOR 1291760.
- Griffith, Sidney H. (2002). "Christianity in Edessa and the Syriac-Speaking World: Mani, Bar Daysan, and Ephraem, the Struggle for Allegiance on the Aramean Frontier". Journal of the Canadian Society for Syriac Studies. 2: 5–20. doi:10.31826/jcsss-2009-020104. S2CID 212688584. Archived from the original on 2018-12-11.
- Griffith, Sidney H. (2006). "St. Ephraem, Bar Daysān and the Clash of Madrāshê in Aram: Readings in St. Ephraem's Hymni contra Haereses". The Harp: A Review of Syriac and Oriental Studies. 21: 447–472. doi:10.31826/9781463233105-026.
- Harrak, Amir (1992). "The Ancient Name of Edessa" (PDF). Journal of Near Eastern Studies. 51 (3): 209–214. doi:10.1086/373553. S2CID 162190342. Archived from the original (PDF) on 2014-08-09.
- Healey, John F. (2007). "The Edessan Milieu and the Birth of Syriac" (PDF). Hugoye: Journal of Syriac Studies. 10 (2): 115–127.
- Joosten, Jan (2010). "The Aramaic Background of the Seventy: Language, Culture and History". Bulletin of the International Organization for Septuagint and Cognate Studies. 43: 53–72.
- Joseph, John B. (1997). "Assyria and Syria: Synonyms?" (PDF). Journal of Assyrian Academic Studies. 11 (2): 37–43. Archived from the original (PDF) on 2020-07-15.
- Mazar, Benjamin (1962). "The Aramean Empire and Its Relations with Israel". The Biblical Archaeologist. 25 (4): 97–120. doi:10.2307/3210938. JSTOR 3210938. S2CID 165844359.
- Millard, Alan R. (1980). "A Wandering Aramean". Journal of Near Eastern Studies. 39 (2): 153–155. doi:10.1086/372792. JSTOR 545123. S2CID 161083532.
- Millard, Alan R. (1983). "Assyrians and Arameans". Iraq: British Institute for the Study of Iraq. 45 (1): 101–108. doi:10.2307/4200184. JSTOR 4200184. S2CID 192959948.
- Nöldeke, Theodor (1871). "Die Namen der aramäischen Nation und Sprache". Zeitschrift der Deutschen Morgenländischen Gesellschaft. 25 (1–2): 113–131. JSTOR 43366019.
- Öztemiz den Butter, Mutay (2017). "Cultural Boundaries and Homeland among the Arameans (Syriacs)". Parole de l'Orient. 43: 303–314.
- Palmer, Andrew N. (2003). "Paradise Restored". Oriens Christianus. 87: 1–46.
- Power, Edmond (1919). "The National Problem in Syria and Mesopotamia". Studies: An Irish Quarterly Review. 8 (29): 77–94. JSTOR 30092955.
- Rompay, Lucas van (2000). "Past and Present Perceptions of Syriac Literary Tradition" (PDF). Hugoye: Journal of Syriac Studies. 3 (1): 71–103. doi:10.31826/hug-2010-030105. S2CID 212688244.
- Rompay, Lucas van (2004). "Mallpânâ dilan Suryâyâ Ephrem in the Works of Philoxenus of Mabbog: Respect and Distance" (PDF). Hugoye: Journal of Syriac Studies. 7 (1): 83–105. doi:10.31826/hug-2011-070107. S2CID 212688667.
- Soldi, Sebastiano (2009). "Aramaeans and Assyrians in North-Western Syria: Material Evidence from Tell Afis". Syria: Archéologie, Art et Histoire. 86: 97–118.
- Weltecke, Dorothea (2009). "Michael the Syrian and Syriac Orthodox Identity" (PDF). Church History and Religious Culture. 89 (1–3): 115–125. doi:10.1163/187124109X408023.
- Woźniak, Marta (2015). "The Modem Arameans: In Search for National Identity". Parole de l'Orient. 40: 483–496.

=== Dictionaries ===
- Nicholson, Oliver, ed. (2018). "Beth Aramaye". The Oxford Dictionary of Late Antiquity. Vol. 1. Oxford University Press. p. 234. ISBN 978-0-19-866277-8. LCCN 2017955557.
