= 2022 Jabal al-Bishrī clashes =

Part of the Syrian Civil War

- Part of the Syrian Desert campaign (December 2017–present) during the Syrian civil war
Date	20–23 June 2022 (3 days)
Location	Jebel Bishri, border between Deir ez-Zor Governorate, Raqqa Governorate and Homs Governorate.
Result	Inconclusive

Belligerents
(Syria) Syrian Arab Republic: National Defense Force; Russia (aerial support): Air Force	Islamic State

Units involved
Syrian Arab Army	Military of the Islamic State

Strength
Unknown	Unknown

Casualties and losses
26 killed	7+ killed
- 2 civilian bus drivers killed

The 2022 Jabal al-Bishrī clashes were a set of clashes that took place in the Jabal al-Bishrī highland area on the border of the Deir ez-Zor Governorate, Raqqa Governorate and Homs Governorates between forces of the Syrian Government and the Islamic State.

The attacks came after the Syrian Observatory for Human Rights (SOHR) reported on a large grouping of Islamic State fighters in the Palmyra desert on 9 June.

== The clashes ==
On 20 June, 11 Syrian government soldiers and two bus drivers were killed in an ambush by ISIS militants, targeting Syrian Army buses transporting soldiers on the highway in the Al-Jira area. The Islamic State later claimed responsibility for this attack.

On 21 June, three Syrian government soldiers were killed and three others were injured after IS fighters attacked a temporary military outpost in the Jabal Al-Bishri desert on the administrative boundary between Raqqa and Deir az-Zour provinces in northeastern Syria under the cover of a sandstorm.

On 22 June, late in the day, clashes began between government and IS forces in the Jabal Al-Bishri desert, following aerial bombardment in the area by Russian warplanes, targeting IS positions. These clashes continued into the next day, leaving at least 9 Syrian soldiers and 7 IS fighters dead.

SOHR reported that on 24 June, in response to the clashes, Syrian government forces launched large-scale combing operations in the area to find and eliminate IS cells in the region.
