= Aramaization of Assyria =

Arameanizing Assyria (ancient history)

Aramaization of Assyria was the Aramean impact on the Assyrian Empire, marked by the spread of Aramaic language and practices after western conquests and mass deportations. Large Aramean populations were integrated into Assyria’s army and administration, creating a two-way exchange that reshaped Assyria linguistically and culturally. As the number of Aramaic speakers increased in Assyria, the population gradually shifted from Akkadian to Aramaic. Over time, Aramaic became the empire's lingua franca, eventually replacing the Assyrian dialect of Akkadian as the vernacular. As a result of bilingualism and the subsequent language shift, both Akkadian and Aramaic were impacted, and Aramaic absorbed numerous loanwords from Akkadian.

By the late second and early first millennium BCE, Arameans emerged as a major force across northern Mesopotamia and Syria, reshaping the political map, commerce, and the linguistic order of the Near East. Together with other Semitic groups, they cut Assyria off from the Mediterranean Sea by controlling large portions of the Fertile Crescent. By 1000 BCE they were using alphabetic writing. Aramean merchants maintained caravan routes from Damascus to the Tigris, and their presence in Assyrian markets is attested by bronze weights from Nineveh. With their spread across Mesopotamia and the Fertile Crescent, and aided by the diffusion of alphabetic writing, Aramaic speakers eventually outnumbered native Assyrian speakers within Assyria itself.

According to a Middle Assyrian chronicle, a severe famine struck in 1082 to 1081 BCE near the end of Tiglath-pileser I’s reign. Arameans advanced from Tur Abdin, which was called the “land of the Arameans” by Ashur-bel-kala, the son of Tiglath-pileser I. Arameans captured Nineveh and moved into the Assyrian heartland, driving Assyrians to take refuge in Kirruri in the Zagros before Tiglath-pileser I could react to the invasion. Over time, large numbers of Arameans entered Assyria through wars, migrations, and deportations, and they spread through every level of society, including craftsmen, soldiers, scribes, and queens, and as Arameans came to outnumber Assyrians, Aramaic became the empire’s common language, replacing Akkadian in daily life. Arameans thus transformed both the culture and language of Assyria and ultimately outlived it.

== History ==
=== Establishment ===
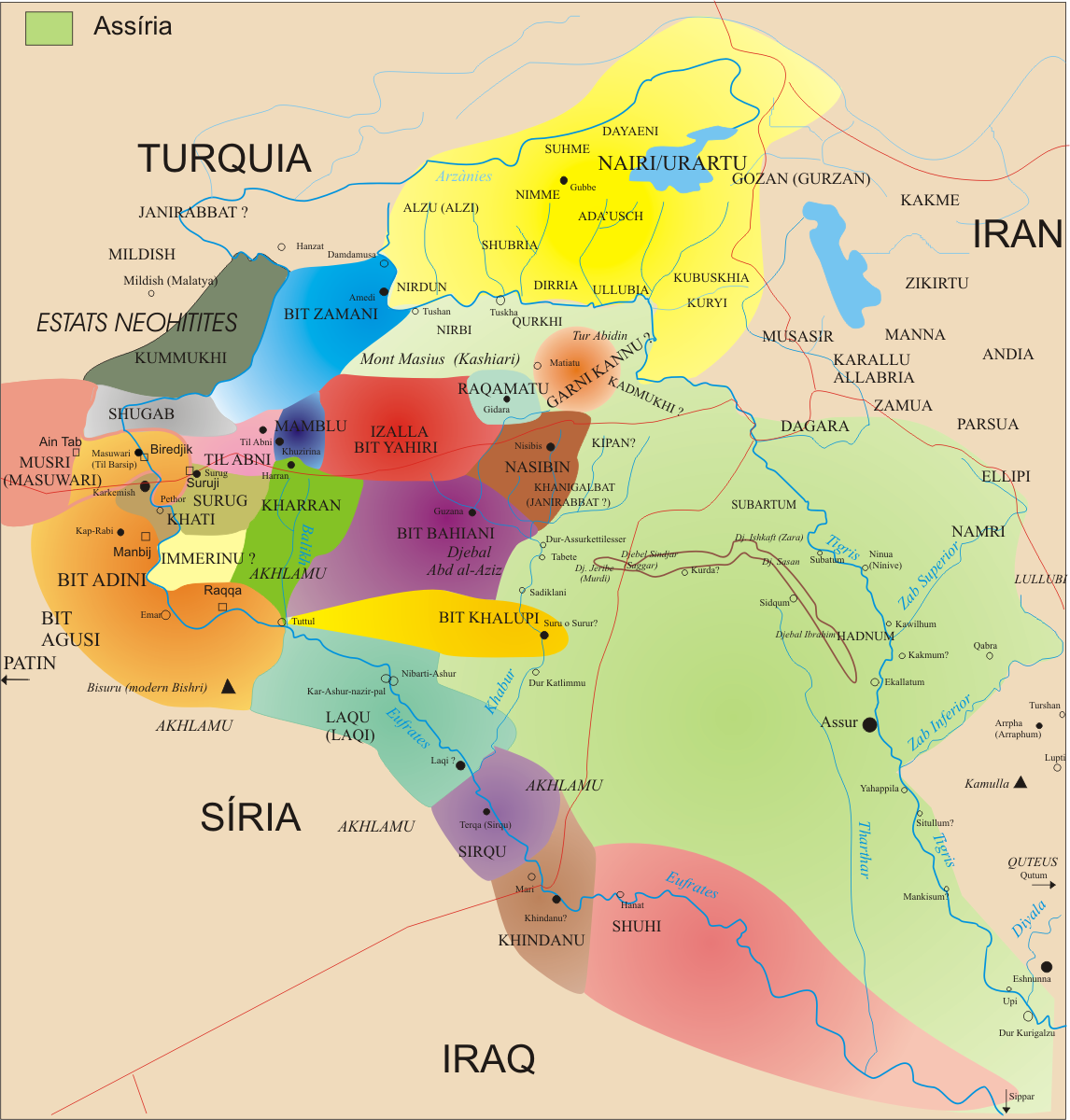
Aramean states of in Upper Mesopotamia during the 9th century BCE, with neighboring Assyria (green) and Urartu (yellow).

From 1114 to 1076 BCE, Tiglath-Pileser I recorded repeated pressure from Aramean groups along the Euphrates, noting twenty-eight pursuits. Although he blocked a major crossing near Jebel Bishri, smaller parties continued to enter Assyrian territory, sometimes several in a single month. In the decades that followed, Aramean communities settled in Tur Abdin and along the Khabur, making Arameans the first inhabitants of Tur Abdin, arriving as caravan groups and armed bands; the incursions became a long-running problem, and the Arameans then put an end to Assyrian rule in the upper Tigris. By 971–970 BCE, the Babylon chronicles report that their New Year festival, Akitu, was not celebrated because of Aramean hostility around Babylon.

After Tiglath-pileser I’s short peak, Assyria moved into a defensive stage: along the Euphrates, scattered Aramean bands kept raiding, campaigns under Ashur-bel-kala brought booty but not lasting control, and expansion stalled, prompting a practical understanding with Babylon under Marduk-shapik-zeri. Assyrian efforts to push outward were checked by Aramean migrations into Mesopotamia, which pulled Assyria back inside its borders and left Syria to stand on its own. Looking back on this troubled era, the later king Ashur-dan II wrote that in the days of Shalmaneser II and Ashur-rabi II the Arameans burned cities, seized Assyrian lands, and spread violence; many Assyrians, worn down by hunger and famine, abandoned their homes.

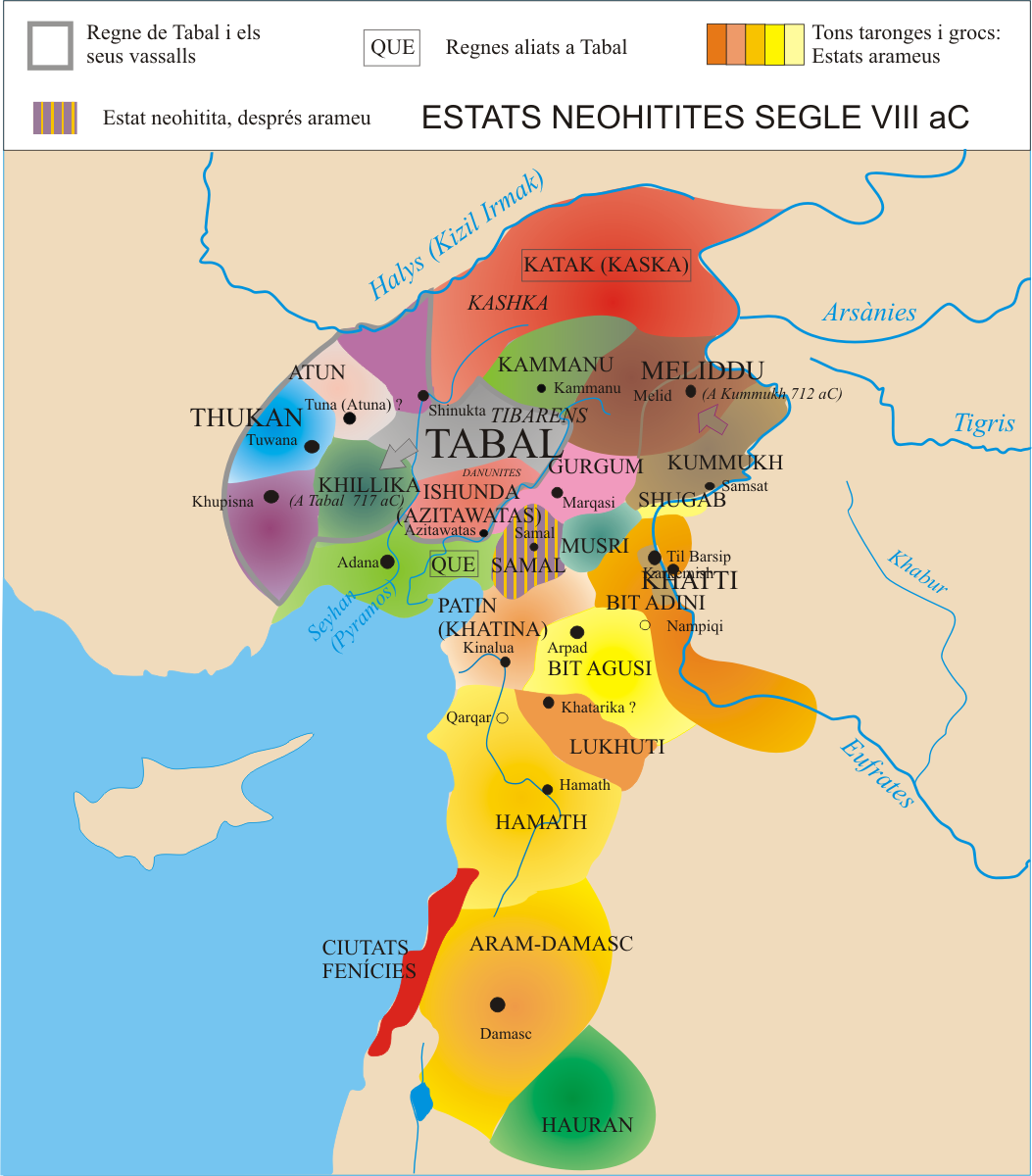
Various Luwian and Aramean (orange shades) states in the 8th century BC.

By the 10th century BCE, Aramean clans in Syria had already coalesced into recognizable states: Aram-Damascus, Hamath, Bit-Agusi around Aleppo, and Bit-Adini on the Euphrates. These polities fortified their towns, levied revenues, patrolled caravan corridors, concluded treaties, and mustered armies, so they appear in both Assyrian and West Semitic sources as established powers. Farther east, in the Jazira and the upper Tigris–Khabur zone of Mesopotamia, the shift was slower: many groups stayed mobile through the 10th century, herding and raiding while only gradually taking up cultivation. During the 9th century they settled more permanently, strengthened urban centers, and organized into named “houses” (Bit-X polities), functioning as ordinary territorial kingdoms that could be taxed, bargained with, or fought.

=== Economy and trade ===
Aramean traders became major carriers of long-distance commerce in western Asia, running caravans across the desert routes to the Tigris and dominating market activity; finds such as bronze lion-weights from Nineveh mark their presence in Assyrian centers. By around 1000 BCE they were using an alphabetic script with pen-and-ink bookkeeping, and administrative business could run in either Assyrian or Aramaic. Aramean scribes working on papyrus while their Assyrian counterparts used clay. Aramaic script then spread widely through Mesopotamia and further eastwards.

Aramean polities sent caravan tribute to Assyria that included myrrh, dromedaries, ivory-inlaid furniture, textiles, iron from Cilicia, livestock, and grain. By the reign of Ashurnasirpal II (883–859 BCE), Aramean groups in Mesopotamia had shifted from mobile trading bands to settled, well-organized kingdoms with effective armies.

=== Arameans in Assyria ===
Neo-Assyrian Empire deportation policy, which began sporadically in the 10th and 9th centuries BCE and became systematic under Tiglath-pileser III, reshaped the empire’s heartland. Over roughly three centuries, around 4.5 million people were displaced, many of them Arameans, and resettled in cities such as Ashur, Nimrud, Nineveh, and Dur-Šarrukin, where they served as laborers, artisans, soldiers, and administrators. The deliberate movement of populations created cities that were linguistically and ethnically mixed. According to H.W.F. Saggs, the urban centers of Assyria became so cosmopolitan that people of native Assyrian descent may have formed only a minority within them.

The empire that emerged from this social transformation was no longer purely Assyrian. It developed as a hybrid civilization in which Arameans played an important cultural and administrative role. Aramaic vocabulary entered daily Akkadian speech, and its alphabetic script, written with pen on parchment or papyrus, came to be used alongside clay-tablet cuneiform. By the reign of Tiglath-pileser III (745–727 BCE), Aramaic was recognized within the imperial administration, as shown in palace reliefs depicting a cuneiform scribe with a stylus and an Aramaic scribe with a pen recording the same information. Within the bureaucracy and army, Arameans appeared frequently on ration lists beside Assyrians and other groups, reflecting their integration as scribes, soldiers, and officials. The empire thus operated in two written languages; Akkadian reserved for royal and monumental use, and Aramaic serving as the main medium of daily governance and trade.

The Prosopography of the Neo-Assyrian Empire records 3,117 individuals with Aramaic names, of which 1,040 are identified as Aramean. Around 599 of these can be located in the Assyrian heartland, concentrated in Nineveh (189), Nimrud (119), and Assur (130). Their recorded professions span agriculture, craft production, commerce, the military, and administration, and include palace staff, priests, and scholars. One of the most prominent figures is Naqia, mother of Esarhaddon, whose name is Aramean. Because many Arameans used non-Aramaic names, their true number was likely far higher. Evidence indicates that Arameans contributed significantly to the empire’s expansion, culture, and administrative development, leaving a strong imprint on its social and political life.

Among those associated with the Assyrian court, Ahiqar stands out as the best-known Aramean scholar. The Book of Ahiqar, the only preserved ancient Aramaic wisdom text, calls him “seal-bearer of Sennacherib, king of Assyria,” “wise scribe, counsellor of all Assyria,” and “father of all Assyria, whose counsel guided King Sennacherib and the whole Assyrian army.” He is also mentioned in the Book of Tobit as Tobit’s nephew and a high official under Esarhaddon. Later traditions identify him with a real scholar named Aba-Enlil-dari, known from the Uruk List of Kings and Sages, which says that “the Arameans call him Ahiqar.” Lists of eponyms include twenty non-Assyrian officials within two centuries, five of them with Aramaic names, illustrating the integration of Aramean elites into the imperial court.

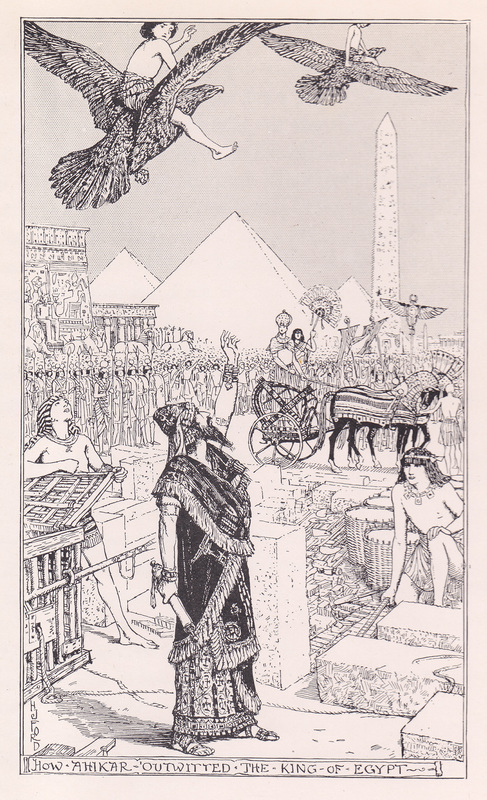
Illustration of Ahiqar and celestial town.

The expansion of Assyria west of the Euphrates increased its reliance on these new populations. Managing the newly conquered regions placed great strain on the state, which historians have described as a “suicidal act.” Because Aramaic was already widely spoken and its alphabetic script was simpler than cuneiform, the imperial administration gradually adopted it for official use. With large Aramean communities now living within Assyrian territory, the smaller ethnic Assyrian population experienced long-term aramaization, a process described as the Arameans’ “cultural conquest of their military conquerors.” This transition reshaped the character of the empire, giving it a distinctly Aramaic cultural and linguistic profile. Aramaic soon displaced Akkadian as the everyday language within Assyria itself, and by the 8th century BCE its script was so widespread that Egyptian, Greek, and Hebrew sources referred to it as “Assyrian writing.”

The growing dominance of Aramaic coincided with Assyria’s political decline after the death of Ashurbanipal. His successors struggled to contain unrest in Babylonia, where Chaldean and Aramean groups contributed to the rise of the Neo-Babylonian Empire. Following Assyria’s collapse, Aramean language and identity continued to flourish. Under the Achaemenids (539–332 BCE), Aramaic gained official status across territories from Egypt to Anatolia and became the empire’s main medium for correspondence and administration. By the sixth century BCE it had emerged as the lingua franca of Western Asia, extending the cultural legacy of the Arameans long after the disappearance of Assyrian rule.

=== Language, writing, and administration ===
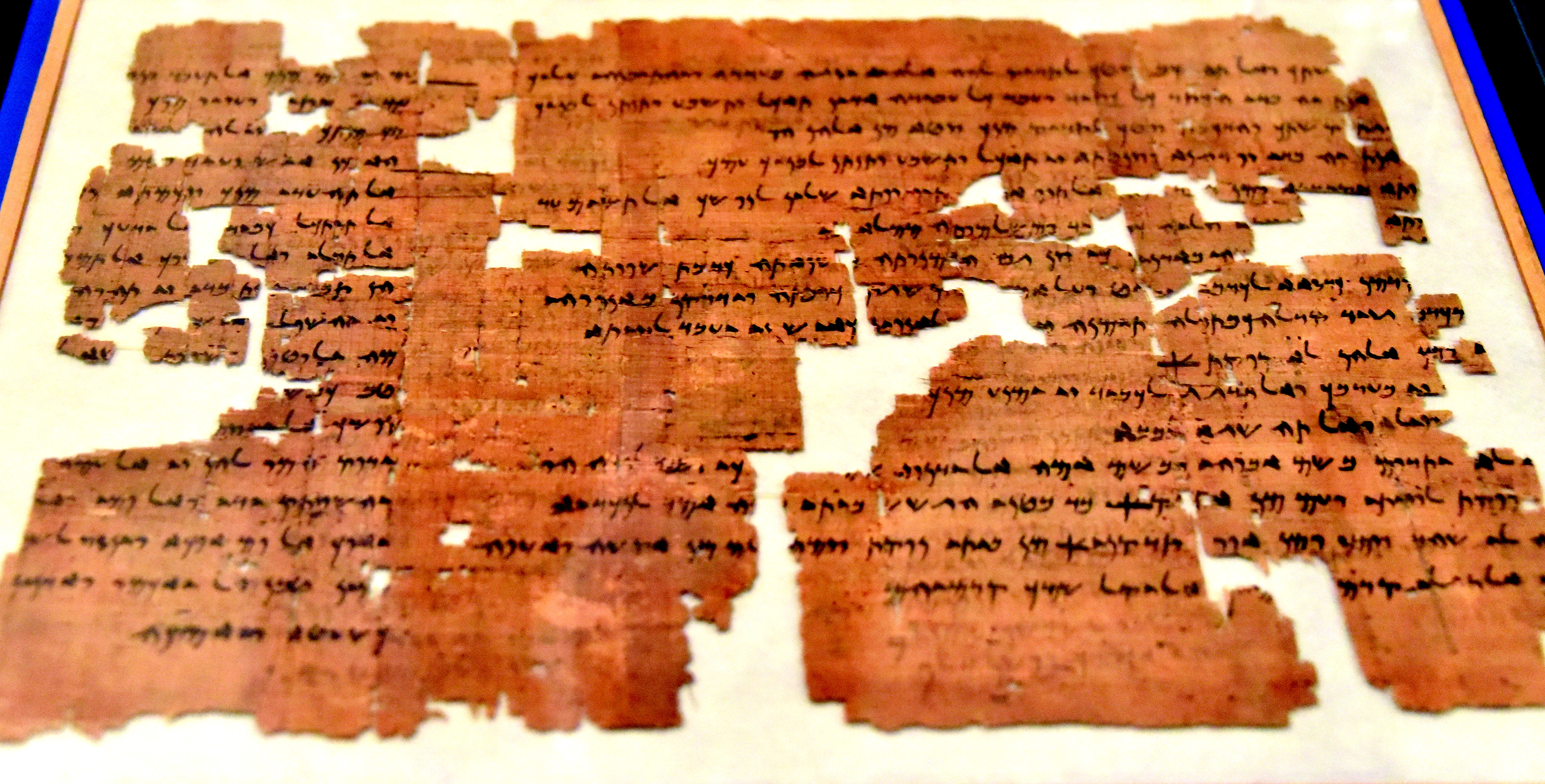
Papyrus narrating the story of the wise chancellor Ahiqar in Aramaic script, 5th century BCE.

During the ninth century BCE, while Assyria regained power and turned several Aramean states into provinces, Babylonia had multiple Aramean families who had settled since the early eleventh century BCE, making Aramaic already present in local usage. With the Arameans losing independence, Assyria moved many of them eastward, forming a new Assyrian heartland with Aramaic speakers, in which the language then became the common medium in both Assyria and Babylonia.

Aramaic was unique compared to other languages; it had a convenient alphabetic script that could be written on handy materials such as leather and parchment, enabling Aramaic to move from being solely the Arameans’ language to becoming the language of the Near East. With merchants and deported groups using Aramaic, imperial officials also adopted it for long-distance communication; they left summary notes tied to Akkadian cuneiform tablets in Aramaic. Both the palace reliefs of Tiglath-Pileser III and the Tell Fekheriye relief show bilingual text, one side in Akkadian and the other in Aramaic, demonstrating Akkadian being pressed into clay while Aramaic is written on scrolls. Aramaic then took on a larger role as the medium connecting Persepolis, Elephantine in Egypt, and Daskyleion in northwestern Anatolia, after it became the Achaemenid Empire’s lingua franca.

A private Aramaic letter on the Assur Ostracon, the bilingual Tell Fekheriye inscription, and cuneiform letters that mention Aramaic written on flexible materials together attest to regular bilingual practice. The earliest alphabetic writing known in Assyria is Aramaic, seen on ostraca, short epigraphs, and on ivories and glazed bricks from Nimrud. Aramaization affected not only the common people but also administrators and kings. Notable Aramean women appear to have married Assyrian kings, and other state officials adopted Aramean ways through Aramean wives and servants; parts of court life such as lifestyle, ideas, and craft production show Aramean influence. Letters from Sargon II reflect this growing influence. In one letter, Sargon II replies to Sin-iddin of Babylon and explains why he would not write to him in Akkadian on clay after Sin-iddin had asked to write in Aramaic on scrolls.
