= Renate Sommer =

German politician (born 1968)

Renate Sommer MEP
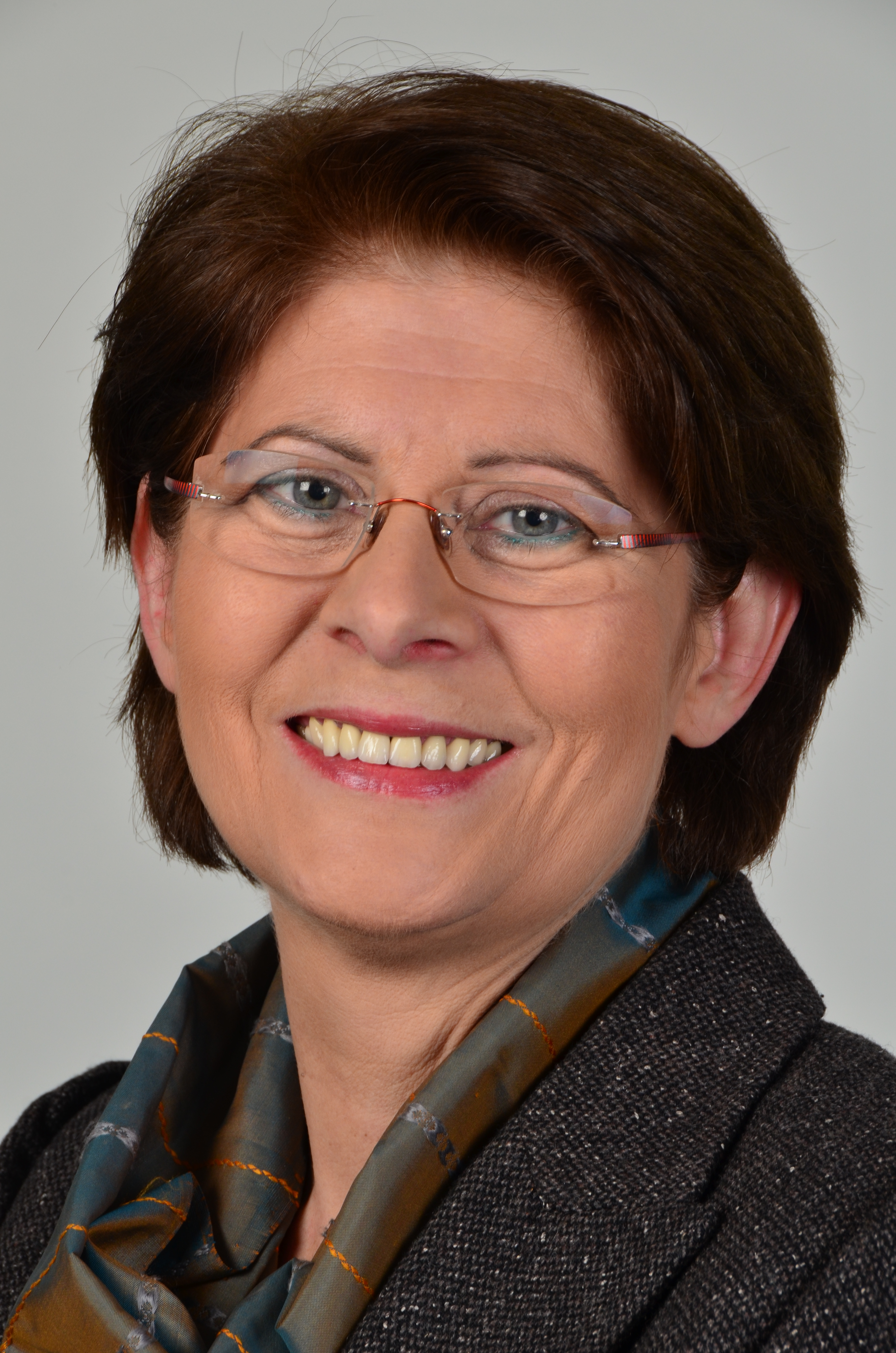

Member of the European Parliament
- Incumbent
- Assumed office 1 July 1999
- Constituency: Germany

Personal details
- Born: 10 September 1958 (age 67) Bochum, Germany
- Party: Christian Democratic Union; European People's Party

Renate Thekla Walburga Maria Sommer (born 10 September 1958) is a German politician who served as a Member of the European Parliament (MEP) from 1999 until 2019. She was a member of the Christian Democratic Union, part of the European People's Party.

== Member of the European Parliament ==
Between 1999 and 2009, Sommer served on the Committee on Transport and Tourism. From 2009 to 2014, she was a member of the Committee on Civil Liberties, Justice and Home Affairs. From 2014 to 2019, she was a member of the Committee on the Environment, Public Health and Food Safety.

From 2014 to 2019, Sommer served as the president of the European Parliament Beer Club. In 2010 she was the rapporteur of the directive on food labelling and she opposes any EU-wide approach to alcohol regulation, citing cultural differences across countries.

In 2019, during the debate on the new General Food Law Regulation which followed the controversial reauthorisation of glyphosate, she opposed increased transparency for the European Food Safety Authority, but the plenary of the European Parliament in December 2018 rejected her proposals and she resigned from her position as rapporteur. The regulation was passed in April 2019 without her proposals.

== Other activities ==
- European Parliament Beer Club, President
- Max Planck Institute for Plant Breeding Research, Member of the Board of Trustees
