= Israelite–Aramean War =

Armed conflict of the Biblical period (9th century BCE)

Israelite-Aramean War
Date	c. 874 BCE
Location	City of Samaria; Aphek (according to 1 Kings 20:30) or Dothan (according to 2 Kings 6:13)
Result	Israelite victory
Territorial changes	Samaria regains some lost territories

Belligerents
Kingdom of Israel (Samaria)	Kingdom of Aram-Damascus

Commanders and leaders
Ahab	Ben-Hadad I

Strength
Unknown	Unknown

Casualties and losses
Unknown	127,000 (according to 1 Kings 20:30)

According to 1 Kings 20:1–34 and 2 Kings 6:8–7:16, the Israelite–Aramean War was an armed conflict between the Kingdom of Israel (Samaria) led by king Ahab and the Kingdom of Aram-Damascus led by king Ben-Hadad I.

== 1 Kings 20 ==
Biblical scholar Burke O. Long (1985) concluded that 1 Kings 20 should be understood as a "historical narrative": it is partially fictional, with clear literary inventions that did not happen, but are meant to dramatise the story with creative imagination; and partially an attempt at a factual telling of past events as understood by the author. Long put the historical narrative somewhere between "popular legend (meaning, of little or no historical value, e.g. 1 [Kings 3:16–28])", and "close to archival records (meaning, reliable for the historian, e.g., 1 [Kings 4:2–6])'.

In 1 Kings 20, the war revolves around the Aramaean king's demand for Ahab to hand over all his gold, silver, wives and children. During back and forth negotiations mediated by messengers, tensions escalate to the point when Ben-Hadad begins beleaguering Ahab's capital city of Samaria. Comparatively little attention is given to describing the battles themselves; emphasis is on the personal conflict between the two kings, and the intervention of an unnamed prophet or "man of God" on the Samarian side is depicted as the game-changer that ensures Ahab's victory. The win at Samaria is followed up by a battle in the city of Aphek, where the Aramean troops had fled to, and are defeated a second time. The Bible puts Aramean casualties as high as 127,000 troops (1 Kings 20:29–30), asserts that the Israelite king Ahab crushed the Arameans, and that Ben-Hadad returned some of the lands to Ahab that his father previously conquered from Ahab's father, and they conclude a peace and trade treaty (1 Kings 20:34).

== 2 Kings 6–7 ==
In 2 Kings 6:8–7:16, Aram is already at war with Israel/Samaria for no apparent reason. The king of Israel is never named, and the king of Aram is only once named 'Ben-Hadad'. Prophet Elisha, the protagonist of the story, warns the Samarian king of the location of the Aramaean camps. The king of Aram is angry at Elisha, and surrounds the city of Dothan where Elisha is. Elisha prays to Yahweh for divine intervention: an allied army shows up on the hills, and the enemy troops are struck by blindness. Elisha leads the captive Aramaean soldiers into Samaria, has Yahweh open their eyes again and hands them to the king. Elisha advised the king him to give the captive Aramaeans food and water, and then release them. Aramaean raids against Samaria stop (2 Kings 6:22).

Some time later, Ben-Hadad king of Aram besieges Samaria, causing a great famine inside the city. The king of Israel blames Elisha and sends soldiers to kill him. Elisha predicts a miraculous end to the famine, and escapes death. Yahweh had caused the Aramaean forces to flee, and four hungry Samarians with leprosy loot their camps before reporting the news of the enemy's sudden disappearance. The king sends scouts to check for ambushes. The scouts report that the Aramaean army has really fled, whereupon the Samarians plunder their abandoned camps (2 Kings 7:16).

== Literature ==
- Long, Burke O. (1985). "Historical Narrative and the Fictionalizing Imagination". Vetus Testamentum. 35 (4). Brill: 405–416. doi:10.2307/1517757. ISSN 0042-4935. JSTOR 1517757.
