= Jebel Bishri =

Highlands in Syria

- Location within Syria Location within Near East

Highest point
- Elevation: 825 m (2,707 ft)
- Coordinates: 35°17′23″N 39°13′8″E

Naming
- Native name: جبل بشرّي (Arabic)

Geography
- Location: Deir ez-Zor Governorate, Syria

Jebel Bishri or Mount Bishri (Arabic: جبل البِشْرِي Jabal al-Bišrī, in Akkadian: ba-sa-ar or bi-si-ir, in Amorite: Biśri) is a highland region in northeastern Syria. It is located on the border between Deir ez-Zor, Raqqa and Homs governorates.

== Geography ==
Jebel Bishri is a broad ridge of mountains extending immediately west of the Euphrates river, northwest of the city of Deir ez-Zor, southwestwards toward Palmyra. It forms part of the Palmyrene mountain belt in central Syria. Its eastern piedmont reaches Deir ez-Zor.

The region is abundant with natural Asphalt which was discovered in 2007. Gas and oil facilities are around the Bishri mountains.

== History ==
Jebel Bishri is associated with the Amorites and was known as the "mountain of the Amorites" (ba-sa-ar šá-dú-ì MAR.TU^{ki}) in Akkadian sources.

The Arab Center for the Studies of Arid Zones and Dry Lands, Syria (ACSAD), headquartered in Damascus, developed a plan to be implemented from 1994 to 2006 to stop desertification in the region of Jebel Bishri. The scheme included planting certain kinds of trees such as Pistacia atlantica and Prunus.

=== Syrian Civil War ===
The SAA was able to retake Jebel Bishri from the Islamic State on 31 August 2017.

On 25 April 2022, as part of Islamic State's 'Vengeance for two Sheikhs' campaign, three Pro-Assad soldiers were killed in clashes with Islamic State fighters in the area. Following the clashes, Russian warplanes reportedly carried out at least 20 airstrikes against Islamic State targets in the nearby deserts, causing an unknown number of casualties.

On 20 June 2022, clashes erupted in the area between Islamic State militants and forces of the Syrian military. Over the course of three days, at least 26 Syrian soldiers and 7 IS fighters were killed. On 3 March 2024, during SAA combing operations, eight NDF militiamen were found shot dead after being executed by ISIS militants on the outskirts of the area. The group had been missing since 21 February.
